= Arthur Holmes Medal =

Award

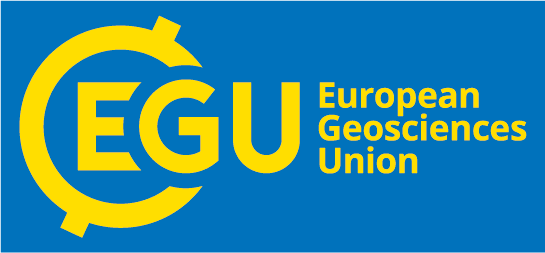
The Arthur Holmes Medal is awarded by European Geosciences Union in recognition of scientific achievements in the field of solid Earth geoscience (geology and geophysics).

The Arthur Holmes Medal and Honorary Membership is one of the most prestigious awards of the European Geosciences Union (EGU). The medal is awarded to scientists who have achieved exceptional international standing in solid Earth sciences for their contributions and scientific achievements. The medal is awarded annually at the General Assembly of the European Geosciences Union since 2005. From 1983 to 2004, the Arthur Holmes Medal was awarded by the European Union of Geosciences (EUG), one of the predecessors of the EGU.

The award is named after Arthur Holmes (1890–1965), a British geologist renown for his contributions in the development of radiometric dating of rocks and minerals and works on mantle convection, which eventually led to the development of the theory of plate tectonics.

== Award winners ==
- Source : (1983–2003) EUG
- Source : (2005–present) EUG
- 2026 Mike Searle
- 2025 Paul Tackley
- 2024 Claudio Faccenna
- 2023 Mathilde Cannat
- 2022 William Lowrie
- 2021 Laurent Jolivet
- 2020 Donald B. Dingwell
- 2019 Jean Braun
- 2018 Celâl Şengör
- 2017 Jean-Pierre Brun
- 2016 Trond H. Torsvik
- 2015 Carlo Laj
- 2014 Kevin C. A. Burke
- 2013 Sierd Cloetingh
- 2012 Vincent Courtillot
- 2011 William E. Dietrich
- 2010 Roland von Huene
- 2009 David Gubbins
- 2008 Anthony B. Watts
- 2007 Claude Jaupart
- 2006 Anny Cazenave
- 2005 Stephen Sparks
- 2003 Charles H. Langmuir
- 2001 Francis Albarède
- 1999 Ikuo Kushiro
- 1997 Edward M. Stolper; B. Wood
- 1995 C.J. Allègre; R.K. O'Nions
- 1993 J.F. Dewey
- 1991 J.G. Ramsay; Maurice Mattauer
- 1989 W.S. Fyfe
- 1987 G.J. Wasserburg
- 1985 A.E. Ringwood
- 1983 Dimitri S. Korzhinskii; H. Ramberg

== See also ==
- List of geophysics awards
