= Kevin C. A. Burke =

British geologist (1929–2018)

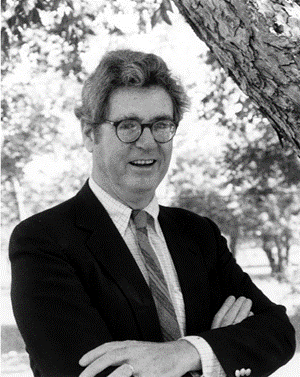
- Kevin Burke in the middle 1980s. Photo provided courtesy of Lunar and Planetary Institute, Houston, TX
- Born: Kevin Charles Anthony Burke; November 13, 1929; London, UK
- Died: March 21, 2018 (age 88); Gloucester, Massachusetts, USA
- Citizenship: UK (1929-1979), USA (1979-2018)
- Education: PhD, University of London, 1953
- Occupation: Professor of Geology
- Employers: University of Ghana (1953-1956) * British Geological Survey (1956-1961) * University of the West Indies (1961-1965) * University of Ibadan (1965-1972) * SUNY Albany (1973-1983) * Lunar and Planetary Institute (1983-1988) * University of Houston (1983-2018)
- Organizations: Erindale College, Toronto (1972-1973) * Geological Survey of Norway (2003-2009) * Physics of Geological Processes, University of Oslo (2009-2013) * Centre for Advanced Study at the Norwegian Academy of Science and Letters (2010) * Centre for Earth Evolution and Dynamics, University of Oslo (2013-2016)
- Known for: Contributions in plate tectonics
- Awards: GSA Career Contribution Award (2004) * Penrose Medal (2007) * Arthur Holmes Medal (2014)

Kevin Charles Anthony Burke (November 13, 1929 – March 21, 2018) was a geologist known for his contributions in the theory of plate tectonics. In the course of his life, Burke held multiple professorships, most recent of which (1983-2018) was the position of professor of geology and tectonics at the Department of Earth and Atmospheric Science, University of Houston. His studies on plate tectonics, deep mantle processes, sedimentology, erosion, soil formation and other topics extended over several decades and influenced multiple generations of geologists and geophysicists around the world.

== Biography ==
=== Early life and education ===
Kevin Burke was born on November 13, 1929, in London, England, to a cultured family of Irish descent. He obtained his B.Sc. degree from University College London in 1951, and a Ph.D. degree from the University of London in 1953. His Ph.D. study focused on mapping and dating Barrovian metamorphic rocks and granites in the Connemara area of western Ireland.

=== Scientific work ===
From 1953 to 1972, Burke held a series of teaching and research positions in geology, including a lecturer position at the University College of the Gold Coast (now the University of Ghana, 1953–1956) and a senior geologist position at the Atomic Energy Division of the British Geological Survey (1956–1961). While at the British Geological Survey, he worked in the east African rift and in South Korea. During that time he married his lifelong companion, Angela Marion Burke. From 1961 to 1965, Burke was the head of the Geology Department at the University of the West Indies in Kingston, Jamaica, and held a position of the head of the Geology Department at the University of Ibadan, Nigeria, from 1965 to 1972.

A critical turn in Burke's career occurred in 1972–1973 when he became a visiting professor at Erindale College of the University of Toronto, Canada. There, he became a close associate of J. Tuzo Wilson, who at that time was one of the most prominent proponents of plate tectonics and studies of volcanic hotspots. During his time in Toronto with Wilson, Burke began a lifelong study of hotspots, rifting and mantle processes, which was enhanced by his previous field experiences in Africa and the Caribbean.

In 1973, Burke was invited by John F. Dewey to join the faculty at the State University of New York at Albany, which had assembled a group of geoscientists interested in plate tectonics, hotspot studies, rifting, and field-based ophiolite studies. During his 10-year residence in Albany, Burke produced many seminal papers on continental rifting, hotspots, Caribbean tectonics, and the effects of continent-continent collision in Asia and other places.

In 1983, Burke joined the faculty of the University of Houston and also worked as director and associate director of the Lunar and Planetary Institute at NASA in Houston until 1988. In the 1990s and 2000s, in addition to mentoring graduate students and teaching at the University of Houston, he held many visiting professorships at NASA, JPL, UCLA, Carnegie Institute, and the University of Oslo, Norway.

From 2003 and until his death in 2018, Kevin Burke worked in close collaboration with Trond H. Torsvik, who was then the head of the Geodynamics research group at the Geological Survey of Norway and later became a professor of geology at the University of Oslo, Norway. This collaboration resulted in several seminal contributions, describing the causal links between the two large-scale structures in the lowermost part of the Earth mantle (Large Low Shear-wave Velocity Provinces, or LLSVPs), the large-scale geometry of mantle convection, mantle plumes and surface hotspot volcanism.

Burke was the first who recognized that the most prominent mantle plumes feeding active hotspots rose from the margins of LLSVPs, which he termed the "Plume Generation Zones" (PGZs). Evidence for long-term stability of LLSVPs (over time scales of hundreds of millions of years) from paleogeographic reconstructions of large igneous provinces and kimberlites, led Burke and Torsvik to develop a new approach to absolute plate reconstructions (PGZ method), in which the geological records of hotspot volcanism are used to constrain the longitudinal positions of lithospheric plates in the originally unconstrained reconstructions based on paleomagnetism. This work stimulated renewed interest to the LLSVPs in the geosciences community, resulting in a growing number of studies aimed to address the origin and evolution of the LLSVP structures in the lowermost mantle. The long-term temporal stability of LLSVPs has not yet been fully accepted by the scientific community and remains a field of on-going debate and active research.

=== Professional communities ===
Over his entire scientific career, Kevin Burke was a very active member of the geological and geophysical scientific community. Burke was a member of the Geological Society of London, the Geological Society of America, the American Geophysical Union, the American Association of Petroleum Geologists, the European Geosciences Union, the Nigerian Mining Geological and Metallurgical Society, the Nigerian Association of Petroleum Explorationists, and the Houston Geological Society. He also served on many national committees, including the National Science Foundation, the National Research Council, NASA, and the National Academy of Sciences.

=== Death ===
Kevin Burke died of a heart attack at the age of 88. He died at Addison Gilbert Hospital in Gloucester, Massachusetts, on March 21, 2018. Burke was survived by a brother and sister, three children and two grandchildren.

The EOS magazine of the American Geophysical Union paid a tribute to Kevin Burke by publishing an article, in which he was described as a "complete geologist of the ilk of Charles Lyell, Alexander von Humboldt, Eduard Suess, or Arthur Holmes."

== Awards and honors ==
Burke's lifetime achievement awards include the Geological Society of America (GSA) Structural Geology and Tectonics Career Contribution Award (2004); the Penrose Medal, the highest award of the Geological Society of America (2007); and the Arthur Holmes Medal and Honorary Membership, one of the most prestigious awards of the European Geosciences Union (2014).

== Terms and acronyms ==
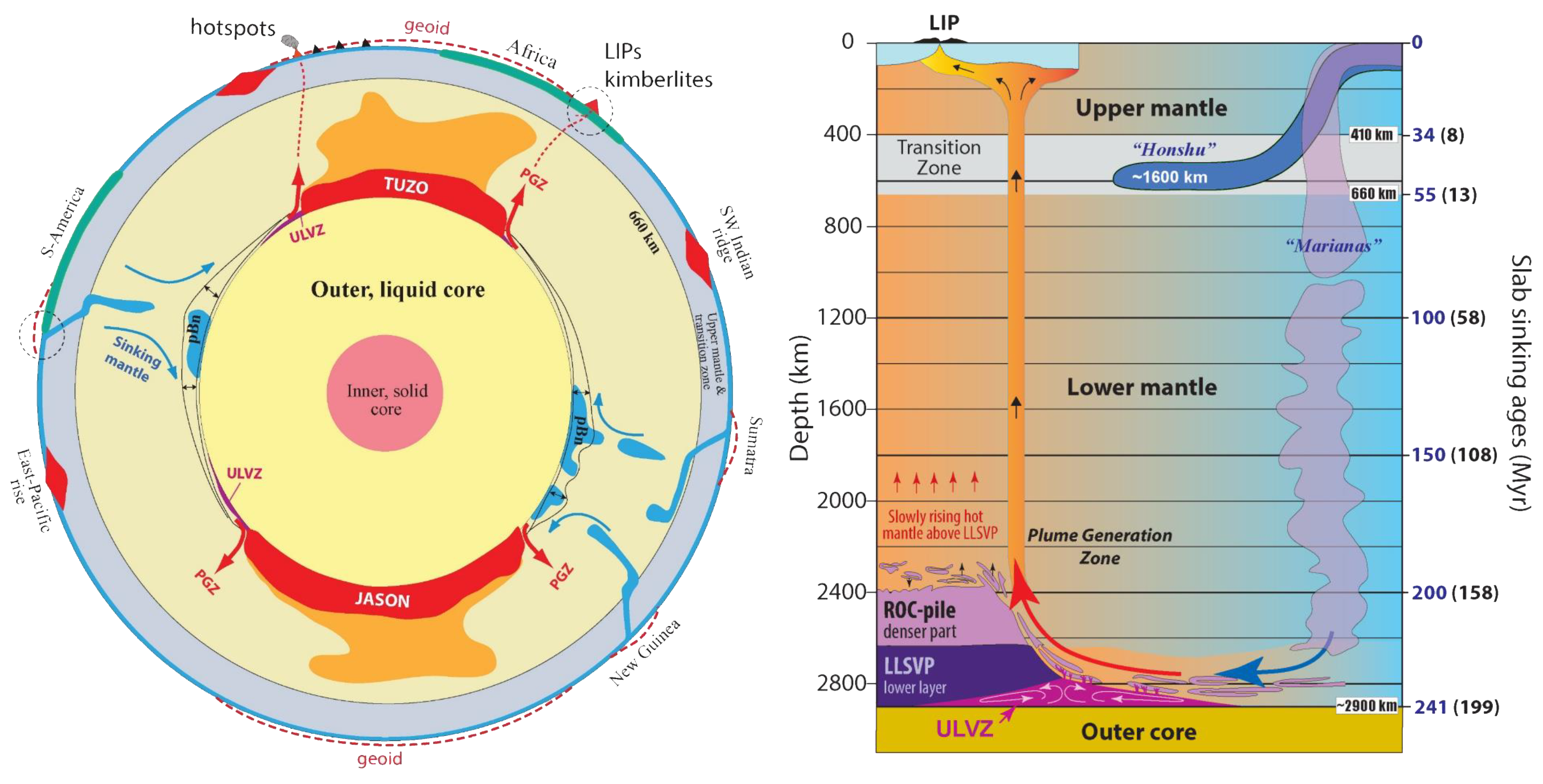
- The Burkian Earth is a simple conceptual model of a degree-2 planet with two stable antipodal thermochemical piles at the core-mantle boundary (LLSVPs, TUZO and JASON). Large Igneous Provinces (LIPs), kimberlites, and active hotspots are sourced by deep mantle plumes rising from the Plume Generation Zones (PGZs) at the margins of TUZO and JASON. Convection in the lower mantle is limited to vertically sinking slabs and ascending plumes. Left panel: Schematic cross-section of the Earth in the equatorial plane. Right panel: Schematic vertical cross-section of the Earth's mantle through the Plume Generation Zone (PGZ). Redrawn from Torsvik et al. (2016).
  Kevin Burke coined the term "Wilson Cycle" for the sequence of continental rifting, ocean opening, ocean closure, and continent–continent collision, which was originally suggested by J. Tuzo Wilson in 1966.
- Being a vocal advocate for the stability of LLSVPs, Burke suggested referring to the LLSVP residing under the African plate as "TUZO" (the acronym stands for "The Unmoved ZOne of the Earth mantle" and commemorates J. Tuzo Wilson), and to the one under the Pacific Ocean — as "JASON" ("Just As Stable ON the opposite meridian," after W. Jason Morgan, an influential American geophysicist known for his seminal works on plate tectonics and mantle plumes).
- Another acronym introduced by Kevin Burke is "TANYA," which is the name for a smaller-scale structure of anomalously low shear-wave velocity (Low Shear-wave Velocity Province or LSVP, not to be confused with LLSVP) residing in the lowermost mantle underneath the western coast of North America. The acronym stands for "The Anomalous Near Yellowstone Area" and is presumably a tribute to Tanya Atwater, an American marine geophysicist renowned for her research on the plate tectonic history of western North America.
- The term "Burkian Earth" was used by Torsvik and co-workers for a simple conceptual model of the Earth as a stable "degree-two planet." On the Burkian Earth, mantle flow is dominated by small-scale convection in the upper mantle, whereas circulation in the lower mantle is mostly restricted to sinking lithospheric slabs and mantle plumes rising from the margins of two stable and antipodal LLSVPs (hence degree two). Subduction zones concentrate along a meridian between the two LLSVPs (resembling the Pacific “ring of fire”); hence, slabs sinking all the way to the lowermost mantle also relate to long-wavelength lower-mantle structure dominated by the degree two term.

== Videos (external links) ==
- Arthur Holmes Medal Lecture by Kevin Burke at the 2014 General Assembly of the European Geosciences Union, Vienna, April 29, 2014. (Session details)
- Kevin Burke's speech at the Award Ceremony at the 2014 General Assembly of the European Geosciences Union with introduction by Prof. Lewis Ashwal (43:45-52:10), Vienna, April 30, 2014. (Session details)
