= Louise Kellogg =

Louise Kellogg may refer to:

- Louise H. Kellogg (1959–2019), American geophysicist
- Louise Phelps Kellogg (1862–1942), American historian and educator
- Louise Kellogg (philanthropist) 1903–2001), American dairy farmer and philanthropist, Alaska Women's Hall of Fame inductee
