= Louise H. Kellogg =

American geophysicist (1959–2019)

- Born: November 18, 1959
- Died: April 19, 2019 (aged 59); Vacaville, California
- Education: Cornell University
- Spouse: Doug Neuhauser
- Awards: Presidential Faculty Fellowship
- Scientific career
- Fields: Geophysics, Geodynamics
- Workplaces: University of California, Davis

Louise H. Kellogg (November 18, 1959 – April 15, 2019) was an American geophysicist with expertise in chemical geodynamics and computational geophysics and experience in leading multidisciplinary teams to advance geodynamics modeling and scientific visualization. Kellogg was a distinguished professor at the University of California, Davis and director of the Computational Infrastructure for Geodynamics. She was also a major contributor to the Deep Carbon Observatory project of the Sloan Foundation.

== Early life and education ==
Kellogg was born on November 18, 1959 in Connecticut and grew up in Silver Spring, Maryland. Her father, R. Bruce Kellogg, taught mathematics at the University of Maryland. Kellogg received her B.S. in Engineering Physics and B.A. in Philosophy from Cornell University in 1982. She followed with her Masters in Engineering and Engineering Physics in 1985 and her PhD in Geological Sciences in 1988, both from Cornell University.

== Career ==
After receiving her Ph.D, she was named the Myron C. Bantrell Research Fellow in Geochemistry and Geophysics at the California Institute of Technology. She taught geology as an assistant and then associate professor at UC Davis from 1990 to 1998. In 1998, she was promoted to professor at UC Davis, and she served as the Department's Chair from 2000 to 2008. She also headed the Keck Center for Active Visualization in Earth Sciences (KeckCAVES), which provides expertise on scientific visualization of complex data and models. Kellogg was on the Executive Committee of the Deep Carbon Observatory and a member of its Synthesis Group 2019.

== Research initiatives ==
Kellogg's main research initiatives focused on understanding the flow in the Earth's mantle that drives plate tectonics, and observing and interpreting deformation in the Earth's crust. At UC Davis Kellogg used numerical methods to model aspects of mantle convection. Kellogg also studied Earthquake Physics and Crustal deformation in order to assess seismic hazard of faults. She also worked on the visualization of geosciences data in an immersive environment.

== Awards ==
From 1992 to 1996, Kellogg received a grant from the National Science Foundation as a Presidential Faculty Fellow. She was invited to present the Francis Birch lecture (Structure and Dynamics: An Earth Odyssey) at the American Geophysical Union in 2001. She was elected fellow of the American Geophysical Union in 2010 and the American Association for the Advancement of Science in 2012. She was elected to the American Academy of Arts and Sciences in 2013.

== Personal life and death ==
Kellogg was married to Doug Neuhauser. She was a longtime student of dance, and began serving on the board of directors for the Pamela Trokanski Dance Theatre in 2002. Kellogg also collaborated with dance professor Della Davidson to create Collapse (suddenly falling down), which used KeckCAVES data to insert geological images into a dance performance. The project won the Isadora Dance Award for visual design.

In 2010, Kellogg survived breast cancer; in January 2019, she was diagnosed with metastatic breast cancer and died at her home in Vacaville, California, on April 15, 2019.

== Publications ==
Kellogg published many influential papers over the course of her career. A selection follows.

- Kellogg, L.H.; Wasserburg, G.J. (August 1990). "The role of plumes in mantle helium fluxes". Earth and Planetary Science Letters. 99 (3): 276–289. Bibcode:1990E&PSL..99..276K. doi:10.1016/0012-821X(90)90116-F.
- —; Turcotte, D. L. (1990). "Mixing and the distribution of heterogeneities in a chaotically convecting mantle". Journal of Geophysical Research. 95 (B1): 421. Bibcode:1990JGR....95..421K. doi:10.1029/JB095iB01p00421.
- —; Hager, Bradford H.; van der Hilst, Rob D. (19 March 1999). "Compositional Stratification in the Deep Mantle" (PDF). Science. 283 (5409): 1881–1884. Bibcode:1999Sci...283.1881K. doi:10.1126/science.283.5409.1881. hdl:1874/7609. PMID 10082454.
