= Seth Stein =

American geologist

Seth Avram Stein (born July 12, 1953, in Middletown, Connecticut) is an American geophysicist who has done research in plate tectonics, seismology, and space geodesy. He has also done work in public policy for coping with earthquake hazards.

== Biography ==
Seth Stein's sister became a lawyer, and his brother, Gil, became an archaeologist. Their father was Jerome Leon Stein, a professor of economics at Brown University.

After graduating in 1975 with a B.S. in Earth and planetary sciences from the Massachusetts Institute of Technology (M.I.T.), Seth Stein matriculated at the California Institute of Technology (Caltech). There he graduated in geophysics with an M.S. in 1977 and a Ph.D. in 1978. He was inspired by Keiiti Aki at M.I.T. and by Hiroo Kanamori at Caltech. Stein's doctoral dissertation, supervised by Kanamori, is entitled I. Seismological study of the Ninetyeast and Chagos-Laccadive Ridges, Indian Ocean. II. Models for asymmetric and oblique spreading at midocean ridges. III. Attenuation studies using split normal modes. At Caltech, the three graduate students, Robert J. "Bob" Geller, Emile A. Okal, and Stein often worked together and were called by other geophysicists "The Gang of Three". As a postdoc from 1978 to 1979 Stein did research in geophysics at Stanford University. At Northwestern University he was an assistant professor from 1979 to 1983, an associate professor from 1983 to 1987, and a full professor from 1987 until his retirement in 2023 as professor emeritus. At Northwestern University, from 2006 to 2023 he held the Deering Professorship of Geological Sciences and chaired from 1989 to 1992 the Department of Geological Sciences. During his academic career at Northwestern, he was the supervisor for 30 doctoral dissertation.

In 1982 in Manhattan he married Carol Ann Geller, whom he first met when he was a graduate student at Caltech. She was one of the first women to receive a degree in geophysics from Caltech. She became a professor of earth and environmental sciences at the University of Illinois at Chicago, and the couple collaborated extensively in research on geophysics. Seth and Carol Stein have also collaborated extensively in public education and outreach. They, with 2 co-workers, developed an interpretive guide for a National Park Service journal and, with Abigail M. Foerstner, produced a YouTube video briefly explaining how the Midcontinent Rift controls the geology of the Lake Superior region.

Stein was a visiting professor in the Netherlands in 1998 and in Germany from 2013 to 2014. He was for the academic year 1993–1994 a visiting senior scientist at NASA's Goddard Space Flight Center and from 1998 to 2000 the Scientific Director of the university NAVSTAR Consortium. He was one of the organizers of EarthScope. He served on many national and international scientific committees. In 1986 he was an associate editor for the Journal of Geophysical Research, as well as Geophysical Research Letters. From 1986 to 1989 he was an editor for the Journal of Geophysical Research. He completed a national tour as the 2006 IRIS/SSA (Incorporated Research Institutions for Seismology/Seismological Society of America) Distinguished Lecturer, speaking on Giant earthquakes: why, where, when, and what we can do. In 2008 he was a design consultant for the Field Museum of Natural History's Nature Unleashed: Inside Natural Disasters exhibit, which became in 2009 a touring exhibit (in the USA and Canada) seen, over a number of years, by more than 1.5 million people. From 2019 to 2021 he was president of the natural hazards section of the American Geophysical Union (AGU).

Stein authored the 2010 book Disaster deferred: how new science is changing our view of earthquake hazards in the Midwest for a general audience. He co-authored the 2003 textbook Introduction to seismology, earthquakes, and earth structure (which became widely used in undergraduate college courses in seismology) and the 2014 book Playing against nature: integrating science and economics to mitigate natural hazards in an uncertain world. He also co-edited 6 other books.

The main theme of Stein's research is seismology with phenomena related to earthquakes. He is the author or co-author of more than 200 scientific publications. He and his collaborators did research on tectonic plate motions and how such motions cause earthquakes, as well as how to mitigate societal problems caused by earthquakes. Early in his career at Northwestern University, he and another faculty member led a team of graduate students that developed NUVEL-1, a model providing new insights into plate motions. This model helped to explain the geophysics of the San Andreas Fault and demonstrated that the Indian Plate and the Australian Plate are distinct. Geophysicists routinely compared the NUVEL model with results from space-based geodesy to identify change in plate motion. The model provided a standard for describing plate motions and established a basis for newer models such as MORVEL. Stein made important contributions to models of plate boundary changes involving microplates, He also did research on thermal evolution of the ocean floor and applications of geophysical data to understanding variations in orogeny of the Andes.

In 1999 Stein with 5 co-authors published in the journal Science a paper indicating that the dangers of a major earthquake in the New Madrid Seismic Zone were significantly overestimated. The research of Seth Stein, Emile Okal, and other geophysics on the 2004 Sumatra-Andaman earthquake showed how its devastating, giant tsunami was generated and estimated similar dangers from other subduction zones; they also suggested how GPS data could be used to create a highly effective, real-time system for tsunami warnings and earthquake source determinations. Stein investigated the consequences of post-glacial rebound for earthquakes. He and his collaborators used GPS data to make a comprehensive review of post-glacial rebound in North America and to provide a basis for improved models of mantle viscosity.

In 1989 American Geophysical Union elected Stein a Fellow and also awarded him the James B. Macelwane Medal. The Geological Society of America elected him a Fellow in 1999 and gave him the George P. Woollard Award in 2009. In 2010 he received the European Geosciences Union's Stephan Mueller Medal and was also elected a Foreign Member of Academia Europaea. In 2014 the Royal Astronomical Society awarded him the Price Medal. In 2022 the American Geophysical Union awarded him the Walter H. Bucher Medal.

Stein was a trip leader for the Illinois Chapter of the Sierra Club. Seth and Carol Stein, the parents of a daughter and a son, endowed a graduate fellowship, administered by the Hertz Foundation, for Earth sciences graduate students and an award, admiinistered by the Geological Society of America, for early career geophysicists. In retirement, he continues to be active in the public education programs of the geophysical community and to work with news media and museums.

== Selected publications ==
- Wiens, Douglas A.; Stein, Seth (1983). "Age dependence of oceanic intraplate seismicity and implications for lithospheric evolution". Journal of Geophysical Research. 88: 6455. Bibcode:1983JGR....88.6455W. doi:10.1029/JB088iB08p06455.
- Argus, Donald F.; Gordon, Richard G.; DeMets, Charles; Stein, Seth (1989). "Closure of the Africa-Eurasia-North America Plate motion circuit and tectonics of the Gloria Fault". Journal of Geophysical Research: Solid Earth. 94 (B5): 5585–5602. Bibcode:1989JGR....94.5585A. doi:10.1029/JB094iB05p05585.
- DeMets, C.; Gordon, R. G.; Argus, D. F.; Stein, S. (1990). "Current plate motions". Geophysical Journal International. 101 (2): 425–478. Bibcode:1990GeoJI.101..425D. doi:10.1111/j.1365-246X.1990.tb06579.x.
- Gordon, Richard G.; Stein, Seth (1992). "Global Tectonics and Space Geodesy". Science. 256 (5055): 333–342. Bibcode:1992Sci...256..333G. doi:10.1126/science.256.5055.333. PMID 17743109. S2CID 13171689.
- Stein, Carol A.; Stein, Seth (1992). "A model for the global variation in oceanic depth and heat flow with lithospheric age". Nature. 359 (6391): 123–129. Bibcode:1992Natur.359..123S. doi:10.1038/359123a0. S2CID 4272482.
- Seno, Tetsuzo; Stein, Seth; Gripp, Alice E. (1993). "A model for the motion of the Philippine Sea Plate consistent with NUVEL-1 and geological data". Journal of Geophysical Research: Solid Earth. 98 (B10): 17941–17948. Bibcode:1993JGR....9817941S. doi:10.1029/93jb00782.
- DeMets, Charles; Gordon, Richard G.; Argus, Donald F.; Stein, Seth (1994). "Effect of recent revisions to the geomagnetic reversal time scale on estimates of current plate motions". Geophysical Research Letters. 21 (20): 2191–2194. Bibcode:1994GeoRL..21.2191D. doi:10.1029/94GL02118.
- Stein, Carol A.; Stein, Seth (1994). "Constraints on hydrothermal heat flux through the oceanic lithosphere from global heat flow". Journal of Geophysical Research: Solid Earth. 99 (B2): 3081–3095. Bibcode:1994JGR....99.3081S. doi:10.1029/93jb02222.
- Kirby, Stephen H.; Stein, Seth; Okal, Emile A.; Rubie, David C. (1996). "Metastable mantle phase transformations and deep earthquakes in subducting oceanic lithosphere". Reviews of Geophysics. 34 (2): 261–306. Bibcode:1996RvGeo..34..261K. doi:10.1029/96rg01050.
- Seno, Tetsuzo; Sakurai, Taro; Stein, Seth (1996). "Can the Okhotsk Plate be discriminated from the North American plate?". Journal of Geophysical Research: Solid Earth. 101 (B5): 11305–11315. Bibcode:1996JGR...10111305S. doi:10.1029/96JB00532.
- Norabuena, Edmundo; Leffler-Griffin, Lisa; Mao, Ailin; Dixon, Timothy; Stein, Seth; Sacks, I. Selwyn; Ocola, Leonidas; Ellis, Michael (1998). "Space Geodetic Observations of Nazca-South America Convergence Across the Central Andes". Science. 279 (5349): 358–362. Bibcode:1998Sci...279..358N. doi:10.1126/science.279.5349.358. PMID 9430582.
- Norabuena, Edmundo O.; Dixon, Timothy H.; Stein, Seth; Harrison, Christopher G. A. (1999). "Decelerating Nazca-South America and Nazca-Pacific Plate motions". Geophysical Research Letters. 26 (22): 3405–3408. Bibcode:1999GeoRL..26.3405N. doi:10.1029/1999GL005394. hdl:20.500.12816/2137. S2CID 128557398.
- Ware, Randolph H.; Fulker, David W.; Stein, Seth A.; Anderson, David N.; Avery, Susan K.; Clark, Richard D.; Droegemeier, Kelvin K.; Kuettner, Joachim P.; Minster, J. Bernard; Sorooshian, Soroosh (2000). "SuomiNet: A Real–Time National GPS Network for Atmospheric Research and Education". Bulletin of the American Meteorological Society. 81 (4): 677–694. Bibcode:2000BAMS...81..677W. doi:10.1175/1520-0477(2000)081<0677:SARNGN>2.3.CO;2.
- Park, Jeffrey; Song, Teh-Ru Alex; Tromp, Jeroen; Okal, Emile; Stein, Seth; Roult, Genevieve; Clevede, Eric; Laske, Gabi; Kanamori, Hiroo; Davis, Peter; Berger, Jon; Braitenberg, Carla; Van Camp, Michel; Lei, Xiang'e; Sun, Heping; Xu, Houze; Rosat, Severine (2005). "Earth's Free Oscillations Excited by the 26 December 2004 Sumatra-Andaman Earthquake". Science. 308 (5725): 1139–1144. Bibcode:2005Sci...308.1139P. doi:10.1126/science.1112305. PMID 15905394. S2CID 41705095.
- Blewitt, Geoffrey; Kreemer, Corné; Hammond, William C.; Plag, Hans-Peter; Stein, Seth; Okal, Emile (2006). "Rapid determination of earthquake magnitude using GPS for tsunami warning systems". Geophysical Research Letters. 33 (11). Bibcode:2006GeoRL..3311309B. doi:10.1029/2006GL026145. S2CID 11716706.
- Sella, Giovanni F.; Stein, Seth; Dixon, Timothy H.; Craymer, Michael; James, Thomas S.; Mazzotti, Stephane; Dokka, Roy K. (2007). "Observation of glacial isostatic adjustment in "stable" North America with GPS". Geophysical Research Letters. 34 (2). Bibcode:2007GeoRL..34.2306S. doi:10.1029/2006GL027081. S2CID 16924153.
- Stein, Seth; Liu, Mian (2009). "Long aftershock sequences within continents and implications for earthquake hazard assessment". Nature. 462 (7269): 87–89. Bibcode:2009Natur.462...87S. doi:10.1038/nature08502. PMID 19890328. S2CID 4410313.
- Blewitt, Geoffrey; Hammond, William C.; Kreemer, Corné; Plag, Hans-Peter; Stein, Seth; Okal, Emile (2009). "GPS for real-time earthquake source determination and tsunami warning systems". Journal of Geodesy. 83 (3–4): 335–343. Bibcode:2009JGeod..83..335B. doi:10.1007/s00190-008-0262-5. S2CID 14772887.
- Stein, Seth; Geller, Robert J.; Liu, Mian (2012). "Why earthquake hazard maps often fail and what to do about it". Tectonophysics. 562–563: 1–25. Bibcode:2012Tectp.562....1S. doi:10.1016/j.tecto.2012.06.047.
- Liu, Mian; Stein, Seth (2016). "Mid-continental earthquakes: Spatiotemporal occurrences, causes, and hazards". Earth-Science Reviews. 162: 364–386. Bibcode:2016ESRv..162..364L. doi:10.1016/j.earscirev.2016.09.016.

=== Books ===
- Pringle, Malcolm S.; Sager, William W.; Sliter, William V.; Stein, Seth, eds. (1993). The Mesozoic Pacific: Geology, Tectonics, and Volcanism: A Volume in Memory of Sy Schlanger. Geophysical Monograph Series. Vol. 77. doi:10.1029/GM077. ISBN 0-87590-036-4.
- Stein, Seth; Freymueller, Jeffrey T., eds. (2002). Plate boundary zones. Washington, D.C.: American Geophysical Union. ISBN 9780875905327.
- Stein, Seth; Wysession, Michael (2003). Introduction to seismology, earthquakes, and earth structure. Malden, Massachusetts: Blackwell. 2009 pbk reprint. John Wiley & Sons. April 2009. ISBN 978-0-86542-078-6.
- Pinter, Nicholas; Grenerczy, Gyula; Weber, John; Stein, Seth; Medak, Damir, eds. (2006). The Adria Microplate: GPS Geodesy, Tectonics and Hazards. Springer. ISBN 9781402042331.
- Stein, Seth; Mazzotti, Stéphane, eds. (2007). Continental intraplate earthquakes : science, hazard, and policy issues. Boulder, Colorado: Geological Society of America. doi:10.1130/SPE425. ISBN 978-0813724256. LCCN 2007012988.
- Stein, Seth (2010). Disaster deferred : how new science is changing our view of earthquake hazards in the Midwest. New York: Columbia University Press. ISBN 9780231151399. LCCN 2010029738.
- Stein, Seth; Stein, Jerome (2014). Playing against nature : integrating science and economics to mitigate natural hazards in an uncertain world. Chichester, West Sussex: John Wiley & Sons. ISBN 9781118620823. LCCN 2013046062.
- Morra, Gabriele; Yuen, David A.; King, Scott D.; Lee, Sang-Mook; Stein, Seth, eds. (2016). Subduction dynamics: from mantle flow to mega disasters. Hoboken, New Jersey: American Geophysical Union; John Wiley & Sons (joint publication). ISBN 9781118888995. LCCN 2016427643.
- Landgraf, A.; Kübler, S.; Hintersberger, E.; Stein, S., eds. (2017). Seismicity, fault rupture and earthquake hazards in slowly deforming regions. London: The Geological Society. ISBN 978-1-86239-745-3. LCCN 2016499686.
