= Richard G. Gordon =

American geophysicist (born 1953)

Richard G. Gordon (born 1953) is an American geophysicist, known for his research on global tectonics, including global plate motions and palaeomagnetism. He is noteworthy for leading two global plate motion projects: NUVEL (Northwestern University Velocity) and MORVEL (Mid-Ocean Ridge Velocity). In the geosciences, NUVEL and MORVEL are standard models for global plate motions.

== Education and career ==
Richard G. Gordon was born in California and grew up in east San Jose in the Diablo Range foothills. He graduated in 1975 from the University of California, Santa Cruz with a B.A. in geophysics. At Stanford University he graduated in geophysics with an M.S. in 1977 with a Ph.D. in 1979. His Ph.D. thesis was supervised by Allan V. Cox. For the academic year 1978–1979 Seth Stein was a postdoc at Stanford University. Stein and Gordon began a collaboration on global plate motions — their collaboration lasted over a number of years. In 1979 Stein joined the faculty of geological sciences of Northwestern University. After a postdoctoral year of teaching and research at Stanford, Gordon also joined Northwestern University faculty of geological sciences. He spent 15 years on Northwestern's faculty. Two of Gordon's former doctoral students Charles "Chuck" DeMets (Ph.D. 1988) and Donald Argus (Ph.D. 1990) at Northwestern University were eventually elected Fellows of the American Geophysical Union (AGU) (DeMets in 2011 and Argus in 2018). Gordon, Stein, DeMets, and Argus collaborated extensively. In 1995 Gordon joined the faculty of Rice University, where he is currently W. M. Keck Foundation Professor in Geophysics, Earth, Environmental and Planetary Sciences. In 2020 he gave a lecture at Beijing's China University of Geosciences (CUG).

Gordon's research on global tectonics, tectonophysics, and paleomagnetism has earned him an international reputation. In 1984 Gordon coauthored, with Allan V. Cox and Scott O'Hare, an important paper on palaeomagnetic Euler poles. Gordon's research in tectonophysics has made use of marine geophysics, space geodesy, geodynamics, and numerical modeling. The research of Gordon and his colleagues have quantified relative motions within major tectonic plates and thereby identified at least three major problems with the original theory of plate tectonics. First, the global plate interiors are less rigid than originally hypothesized. Second, the earliest models of plate tectonics need the incorporation of diffuse boundaries among oceanic plates. Third, global plate reconstructions sometimes need the incorporation of effects of horizontal thermal contractions found in geologically young oceanic lithosphere — such thermal contractions are relevant to understanding relative motions among hot spots.

Gordon was awarded an Alfred P. Sloan Foundation Research Fellowship for the academic year 1984–1985. In 1989 he was elected a Fellow of the American Geophysical Union (AGU) and also received the AGU's James B. Macelwane Medal. In 1998 he gave the AGU's Birch Lecture. In 2002 he received the Arthur L. Day Medal from the Geological Society of America (GSA). Upon the occasion of Dan McKenzie's winning of the 2002 Crafoord Prize in Geosciences, Gordon was honored as one of six Earth science Lecturers in the 20002 Crafoord Prize Symposium. In 2019 Gordon was elected a Fellow of the American Association for the Advancement of Science. In 2023 he was awarded the Stephan Mueller Medal of the European Geosciences Union (EGU).

== Selected publications ==
- Gordon, Richard G.; Cox, Allan; Harter, Clayton E. (1978). "Absolute motion of an individual plate estimated from its ridge and trench boundaries". Nature. 274 (5673): 752–755. Bibcode:1978Natur.274..752G. doi:10.1038/274752a0. S2CID 4164339.
- Cox, Allan; Gordon, Richard G. (1984). "Paleolatitudes determined from paleomagnetic data from vertical cores". Reviews of Geophysics. 22: 47–72. Bibcode:1984RvGSP..22...47C. doi:10.1029/RG022i001p00047.
- Gordon, Richard G.; Stein, Seth (1992). "Global Tectonics and Space Geodesy". Science. 256 (5055): 333–342. Bibcode:1992Sci...256..333G. doi:10.1126/science.256.5055.333. PMID 17743109. S2CID 13171689.
- Acton, Gary D.; Gordon, Richard G. (1994). "Paleomagnetic Tests of Pacific Plate Reconstructions and Implications for Motion Between Hotspots". Science. 263 (5151): 1246–1254. Bibcode:1994Sci...263.1246A. doi:10.1126/science.263.5151.1246. PMID 17817426. S2CID 46188431.
- Gordon, Richard G. (1995). "Plate motions, crustal and lithospheric mobility, and paleomagnetism: Prospective viewpoint". Journal of Geophysical Research: Solid Earth. 100 (B12): 24367–24392. Bibcode:1995JGR...10024367G. doi:10.1029/95JB01912.
- Gordon, Richard G. (1997). "Wandering why". Nature. 387 (6629): 131–133. Bibcode:1997Natur.387..131G. doi:10.1038/387131a0. S2CID 4241759.
- Royer, Jean-Yves; Gordon, Richard G. (1997). "The Motion and Boundary Between the Capricorn and Australian Plates". Science. 277 (5330): 1268–1274. doi:10.1126/science.277.5330.1268.
- Gordon, Richard G. (1998). "The Plate Tectonic Approximation: Plate Nonrigidity, Diffuse Plate Boundaries, and Global Plate Reconstructions". Annual Review of Earth and Planetary Sciences. 26: 615–642. Bibcode:1998AREPS..26..615G. doi:10.1146/annurev.earth.26.1.615.
- Gordon, Richard G.; DeMets, Charles; Royer, Jean-Yves (1998). "Evidence for long-term diffuse deformation of the lithosphere of the equatorial Indian Ocean". Nature. 395 (6700): 370–374. Bibcode:1998Natur.395..370G. doi:10.1038/26463. S2CID 4364994.
- Gordon, Richard G. (2000). "The Antarctic connection". Nature. 404 (6774): 139–140. doi:10.1038/35004703. PMID 10724153. S2CID 205005041.
- Gripp, Alice E.; Gordon, Richard G. (2002). "Young tracks of hotspots and current plate velocities". Geophysical Journal International. 150 (2): 321–361. Bibcode:2002GeoJI.150..321G. doi:10.1046/j.1365-246X.2002.01627.x. S2CID 55443445.
- Gordon, Richard G. (2008). "A tale of a trail". Nature Geoscience. 1 (9): 574–575. Bibcode:2008NatGe...1..574G. doi:10.1038/ngeo295.
- DeMets, Charles; Gordon, Richard G.; Argus, Donald F. (2010). "Geologically current plate motions". Geophysical Journal International. 181 (1): 1–80. Bibcode:2010GeoJI.181....1D. doi:10.1111/j.1365-246X.2009.04491.x.
- Argus, Donald F.; Gordon, Richard G.; DeMets, Charles (2011). "Geologically current motion of 56 plates relative to the no-net-rotation reference frame". Geochemistry, Geophysics, Geosystems. 12 (11). Bibcode:2011GGG....1211001A. doi:10.1029/2011GC003751. S2CID 55813237.
- Gordon, Richard G.; Houseman, Gregory A. (2015). "Deformation of Indian Ocean lithosphere: Evidence for a highly nonlinear rheological law". Journal of Geophysical Research: Solid Earth. 120 (6): 4434–4449. Bibcode:2015JGRB..120.4434G. doi:10.1002/2015JB011993. hdl:1911/80856. S2CID 54217232.
