= Wortel =

Wortel is a Dutch and Indonesian word meaning carrot. As a name, it may refer to:

== People ==
- Ans Wortel (1929–1996), Dutch painter, poet and writer
- Meike Wortel (born 1982), Dutch bridge player
- Rinus Wortel (born 1947), Dutch geophysicist
- Willy Wortel, stage name of Willem Klein (1912–1986), Dutch mathematician

== Places ==
- Wortel, Belgium, village in the Belgian municipality of Hoogstraten
