= Michael Searle =

Michael Searle may refer to:

- Michael Searle (rugby league), Australian businessman and rugby league player and executive
- Michael Paul Searle, British geologist

== See also ==
- Michael Searles, English commercial architect
