= John G. Ramsay =

British geologist (1931–2021)

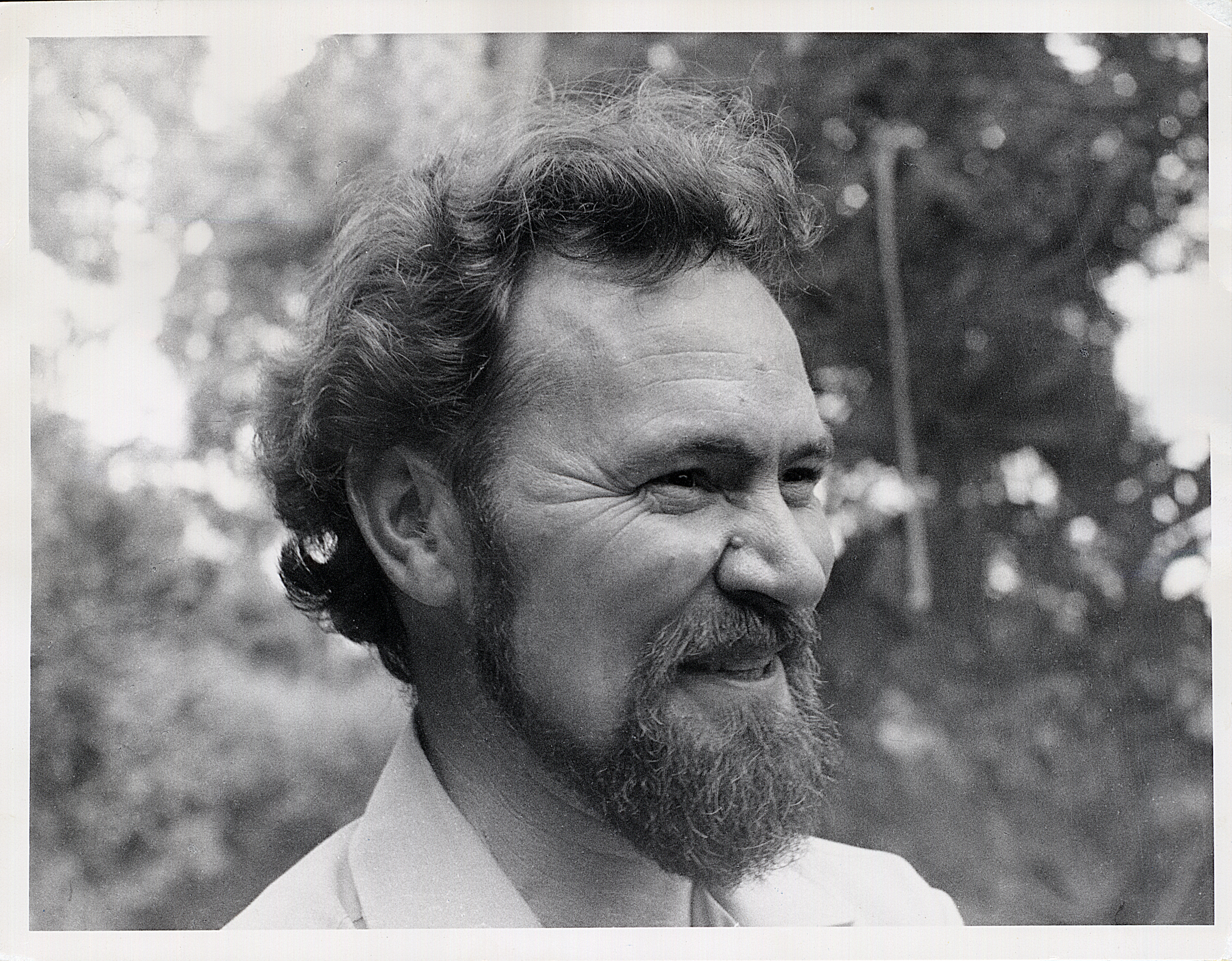
- John Graham Ramsay

John Graham Ramsay CBE FRS (17 June 1931 – 12 January 2021) was a British structural geologist who was a professor at Imperial College London, the University of Leeds and the University of Zurich.

== Career ==
Born in Edmonton, suburban London, in 1931, John Graham Ramsay took his bachelor's degree in geology at the Imperial College of Science and Technology (Imperial), University of London graduating with first class honours in 1952 with Dr John Sutton as his mentor. He did his doctoral work in the Loch Monar area of the Scottish Highlands working on the strain patterns seen in intensely deformed and repeatedly folded rocks of the Moine Series and the relationships seen between folded basement and its cover rocks obtaining a PhD in 1954.

After undertaking military service as a musician (cellist and tenor drummer) in the Corps of the Royal Engineers of Great Britain, he was appointed to a teaching position at the Geology department of Imperial in 1957. Many of his early fundamental research papers were written whilst at Imperial where he became Professor of structural geology in 1966. In the following year he published his first book, Folding and Fracturing of Rocks, which gained him attention in structural geology. He went on to win awards in his field

From 1973 to 1976 he was professor and head of the Department of Earth Sciences at the University of Leeds. In 1976, he was appointed a professor of geology at the Eidgenössische Technische Hochschule (and University of Zürich), Switzerland; a post he held until he retired in 1992. After retirement, he was made professor emeritus at ETH Zurich.. He held a "Doctorat Honoris Causa" of the University of Rennes, France and was an honorary professor at the University of Cardiff in Wales. Prof. Richard J. Lisle from Cardiff is the co-author of his 4th book on applications of continuum mechanics to structural geology.

He undertook extensive field work in the Barberton greenstone belt of South Africa and Zimbabwe, and in the East African rift in Sudan apart from his contributions to the Alpine structural geology before and while at Zurich and the great forte of his, the Caledonian belt of the Scottish Highlands.

He continued to do structural geology research work until the end of his life, and made structural field studies in the Moine thrust zone of northwest highlands of Scotland as an Honorary Research Adviser to the Geological Survey of UK and Ireland. Although officially retired from active geological teaching at ETH Zürich, he continued to teach violoncello (he always loved playing cello) and Chamber Music performance in Isirac, France and was actively engaged in musical compositions.

John Ramsay was author and co-author of four books and many papers in structural geology. He always was of the opinion that the structures actually observed in naturally deformed rocks form the key to our understanding of the tectonic processes and that the development of mechanical models for the origin of these structures must always be compared with natural observations if they are to be truly relevant. This was probably the reason why in all his papers, the theoretical part is first supplemented by experimental simulation followed by photographs of natural examples.

== Honours ==
Ramsay's work in advancing structural geology was recognised by the awards of the Bigsby (1973) and Wollaston (1986) medals of the Geological Society of London, the Société Géologique de France Prestwich Medal in 1989, Sir Arthur Holmes Medal of the European Union of Geosciences (EGU) in 1984, C. T. Clough medal (1962) of the Edinburgh Geological Society, and the University of Liège medal in 1988.

He was named a Commander of the Most Excellent Order of the British Empire (CBE) in the Queen's 1992 Birthday Honours list.

He was elected a Fellow of the Royal Society in 1973 and held Honorary Fellowships of the Geological Society of America, the Société Géologique de France, the Indian National Science Academy, the American Geophysical Union, and the US National Academy of Sciences.

== Awards ==
- 1973 Bigsby Medal
- 1986 Wollaston Medal
- 1992 Arthur Holmes Medal

== Family ==
Ramsay was married to Dorothee. They retired to the village of Issirac in the Ardeche, France. Ramsay died in Zurich, Switzerland on 12 January 2021, aged 89.
