= Mike Gurnis =

American academic and geophysicist

Michael C. Gurnis is the John E. and Hazel S. Smits Professor of Geophysics; Clarence R. Allen Leadership Chair, Seismological Laboratory; Director, Seismological Laboratory; and Director, Schmidt Academy for Software Engineering at the California Institute of Technology. Since 2009, Gurnis has served as director of the Caltech Seismological Laboratory ("Seismo Lab"), a leader in the study of earthquakes and geophysics for more than 100 years.

Gurnis served as director of the Computational Infrastructure for Geodynamics (CIG), an NSF-funded institute operated by Caltech which supports and promotes Earth science by developing and maintaining open-source software for computational geophysics and related fields.

Gurnis was awarded the 2013 Agustus Love Medal for fundamental contributions to geodynamics from the European Geosciences Union. He won the 2024 Inge Lehmann Medal.

== Other reading ==
- McFarling, Usha Lee. How Push Comes to Shove. Los Angeles Times. June 17, 2002. https://www.latimes.com/archives/la-xpm-2002-jun-17-sci-plume17-story.html
