= Stephan Mueller Medal =

Annual award in geophysics since 1997

The Stephan Mueller Medal is an annual award in geophysics established in 1997 by the Tectonics and Structural Geology (TS) Division of the European Geophysical Society (EGS). Since the merger of the EGS into the European Geosciences Union (EGU) in 2002, the medal has been awarded by the EGU since 2005. The medal, for outstanding achievements in tectonics and geophysics of the lithosphere, is awarded in honour of Stephan Mueller. The medal has been awarded during the annual EGU General Assembly each year since 2005 (except for the year 2022 due to the COVID-19 pandemic). The prize recipient is selected by a committee from the EGU's Section on Solid Earth Geophysics.

== Recipients ==
- 1998: Peter A. Ziegler
- 1999: Raul Madariaga
- 2000: Rinus Wortel (M. J. R. Wortel)
- 2005: Alan G. Green
- 2006: Sierd A. P. L. Cloetingh
- 2007: David G. Gee
- 2008: Jean-Pierre Brun
- 2009: Stefan M. Schmid
- 2010: Seth Stein
- 2011: Laurent Jolivet
- 2012: Jacques Malavieille
- 2013: Leigh H. Royden
- 2014: Claudio Faccenna
- 2015: Evgueni B. Burov
- 2016: Renée Heilbronner
- 2017: Cees Passchier
- 2018: John P. Platt
- 2019: Serge Lallemand
- 2020: Mathilde Cannat
- 2021: R. Dietmar Müller
- 2023: Richard G. Gordon
