= Rinus Wortel =

Dutch geophysicist (born 1947)

- Born: Marinus Johannes Richardus Wortel; 18 December 1947 (age 78); Amsterdam, Netherlands
- Occupation: Geophysicist
- Awards: Stephan Mueller Medal (2010), Knight of the Order of the Netherlands Lion (2012)

Academic background
- Education: Utrecht University
- Thesis: Age-dependent subduction of oceanic lithosphere (1980)
- Doctoral advisor: Nicolaas Jacob Vlaar

Academic work
- Discipline: Tectonophysics
- Institutions: Utrecht University

Marinus Johannes Richardus "Rinus" Wortel (born 18 December 1947) is a Dutch geophysicist. He was professor of tectonophysics at Utrecht University between 1989 and 2012. Since 2013 he has been unpaid professor of geophysics at the same university.

== Early life ==
Wortel was born on 18 December 1947 in Amsterdam. He attended the gymnasium. Wortel subsequently wanted to study geology and had a strong interest in the physical aspects of the field. In 1965 he started his study of geophysics at Utrecht University, at that time the only place in the Netherlands offering the study. In 1980 Wortel obtained his PhD at Utrecht University under N.J. (Nico) Vlaar with a thesis titled: Age-dependent subduction of oceanic lithosphere.

== Career ==
After his studies Wortel worked as scientific employee and later associate professor of theoretical geophysics at his alma mater. In 1989 he was named professor of tectonophysics at the same university. From 1992 to late 1996 he was dean of the faculty of earth sciences. He was professor of tectonophysics until 2012. The next year the university named him unpaid professor of geophysics.

During his career Wortel was founder and director of the Geodynamisch Onderzoeksinstituut. From 1996 he also served as scientific director of the Vening Meinesz Research School of Geodynamics. He was chair of the board of directors of the Netherlands Research Centre for Integrated Solid Earth Science.

The research of Wortel has focused on physical aspects of plate tectonics, especially the geophyisical development of the Mediterranean Sea area. In the early 2010s his research group expected that a new fault was forming between Europe and Africa, with the Eurasian Plate being thrust under the African Plate, which had been the reverse. He has also performed research into the dynamics and deformation of the lithosphere, seismic energy release and tectonic processes along convergent plate boundaries. He worked on integration of numerical models, with observations coming from geology, geophysics and geodesy. Wortel and his research group in 1992 developed an hypothesis on lateral migration of slab detachment. Early in his career he performed research in the Andes with his promotor, Vlaar. He also worked together with Sierd Cloetingh on modeling intraplate stress.

In 2018, Wortel became head of the research programme DeepNL, of the Dutch Research Council, which was initiated to look into the long term consequences of the winning of gas in the Groningen gas field. Specific research projects included subsidence, risk analysis, and earthquake forecasting. Wortel called it a unique project, comparable with the Dutch efforts of protection from the sea.

In 1997, he was part of a commission initiated by six Dutch universities to look into a fifth academic year for scientific studies, which the commission ultimately recommended. He has been involved in the handing out of the Vening Meineszprijs, being chair of the committee in 2010. He was editor of the Geophysical Journal.

== Honours and awards ==
Wortel was elected a member of the Royal Netherlands Academy of Arts and Sciences in 1994. He was elected a member of the Academia Europaea in 1995. Wortel won the 2000 Stephan Mueller Medal of the European Geophysical Society, in "recognition of his fundamental contributions to modelling of subduction zone dynamics".

In 2011 he won the Van Waterschoot van der Grachtpenning of the Koninklijk Nederlands Geologisch Mijnbouwkundig Genootschap. In 2012 Wortel was made Knight in the Order of the Netherlands Lion.
