= Dietmar Müller =

Australian geophysicist and researcher (born 1959)

- Known for: GPlates
- Awards: Australian Laureate Fellowship by Australian Research Council, 2019 Jaeger medal by Australian Academy of Science
- Scientific career
- Fields: Plate tectonics; Geophysics
- Workplaces: The University of Sydney
- Notable students: Stuart Clark, Carmen Gaina, Raquib Hassan, Christian Heine, Andrew Merdith, Craig O'Neill, Maria Seton, Grace Shephard, Joanne Whittaker, Sabin Zahirovic
- Website: sydney.edu.au/science/about/our-people/academic-staff/dietmar-muller.html

Dietmar Müller FAA is a professor of geophysics at the school of geosciences, the University of Sydney.

== Early life and education ==
Müller received his undergraduate degree from the Christian-Albrechts University of Kiel in Germany, followed by a PhD in earth science from the Scripps Institution of Oceanography in San Diego, California in 1993.

== Career ==
After joining the University of Sydney as a lecturer in geophysics in 1993, Müller established the University of Sydney Institute of Marine Science (now the Marine Studies Institute) and built the EarthByte research group. He has been mainly active in research in the area of plate tectonics using GPlates software that has been developed under his leadership at the EarthByte group.

== Research highlights ==
Müller leads an international research effort that developed and continues to refine a Virtual Earth Laboratory to develop custom software, workflows and research data to produce interactive, open-access models and visualisations of Earth's dynamic history, especially focused on the oceanbasins. It has led to numerous discoveries that have transformed our fundamental understanding of the Earth's evolution, environments and geological resources.

Müller leads the AuScope NCRIS-supported open-source GPlates software project (www.gplates.org) for plate tectonic reconstructions. GPlates, and its companion pyGPlates python library, have become the global de facto standard for plate model construction and plate tectonic data analysis. It is specifically designed to generate time-dependent boundary conditions for geodynamic models to link plate motion and deformation to both deep Earth evolution as well as surface processes (erosion and sedimentation). The software has been used to create the first global plate including diffuse plate deformation in areas of crustal extension and shortening (Müller et al., 2019). Another companion software, pyBacktrack (Müller et al., 2018) allows the backtracking of the paleo-water depth of drill sites on ocean crust and tectonic subsidence analysis of wells on stretched continental crust, including the effect of mantle-convection-driven dynamic topography. This provides a framework for reconstructing the accumulation history of sediment components (lithologies) through time.

In one of his most cited work, Müller led the construction of the first digital grid of the geological age of the world's ocean basins which became the resource for hundreds of publications. Using ocean basin reconstructions, his team showed that the ancient Izanagi mid-ocean ridge was destroyed when it plunged beneath an area stretching from Korea to north of Japan (Science, 2007). Müller also used reconstructions of the age-area distribution of the ocean basins to demonstrate that long-term sea-level variations over 100 metres in amplitude have been driven by plate tectonics and changing ocean basin volumes (Science, 2008).

Using a combination of tectonic and geodynamic models he tackled a long-standing debate on how the Eastern Australian Highlands formed, by showing that they may result from the Australian plate wobbling over the convecting mantle (Earth and Planetary Science Letters, 2016). He used a similar approach to connect plate tectonic and mantle convection models with global sea-level models to reconstruct global surface dynamic topography through time (Gondwana Research, 2018) I. The good overall match between predicted dynamic topography patterns to geologically mapped paleo-coastlines is strong evidence that mantle-driven topographic change is a critical component of relative sea level change, and the main driving force for generating the observed geometries and timings of large-scale continental inundation through time.

Müller's group has developed spatial and spatio-temporal data mining across a wide range of areas. He applied internet-based data-mining algorithms to earthquake hazard mapping, finding that nearly all of the largest earthquakes of the past century have been associated with regions where oceanic fracture zones intersect deep-sea trenches (Solid Earth, 2012). Using spatio-temporal data mining, his team also constructed the first prospectivity map for Australian opal, revealing that it occurs where Cretaceous shallow seas and river systems alternated in Australia's Great Artesian Basin, followed by uplift (Computers and Geosciences, 2013). His team also used spatio-temporal data analysis to analyse the plate tectonic environments where copper-gold porphyry deposits are likely to form along convergent plate margins (Butterworth et al., 2016).

Müller currently leads an Australian Research Council Industry Transformation Research Centre called the Basin Genesis Hub (2015–20) which has five industry and four university partners. The hub is undertaking the simultaneous modelling of deep-Earth and surface processes, from basin scale to individual sediment grains, and developing cutting-edge basin simulations for an improved understanding of the structure and evolution of sedimentary basins. The Basin Hub's recently developed Badlands software is now being used to simulate erosion and sedimentation, modelling the evolution of river systems and transport of terrigenous sediments into sedimentary basins through time in high resolution.

== Honours and awards ==
His awards include:

- 2000: Fresh Science prize awarded by the British Council and "ScienceNOW!”
- 2004: Carey Medal for contributions to global tectonics awarded by the Geological Society of Australia
- 2006: David I Groves Award for the best paper published in the Australian Journal of Earth Sciences
- 2006: Fellow, American Geophysical Union
- 2009: ALF – Australian Laureate Fellowship,
- 2016: Vice-Chancellor's Award for Outstanding research, University of Sydney
- 2017: FAA – Fellow of the Australian Academy of Science
- 2018: NSW Premier's Prize for Excellence in Earth Sciences
- 2019: Excellence Professor Award, Petersen Foundation, Germany
- 2019: Jaeger Medal Australian Academy of Science, 2019
- 2020: Clarke Medal, Royal Society of New South Wales
- 2021: Stephan Mueller Medal, European Geosciences Union

== Research impact ==
The international EarthByte e-research group led by Müller has over 100 members from seven countries. His research has influenced geoscience education of the public and universities. The global impact of GPlates on end-users is illustrated by the recent development of the powerful, interactive online GPlates portal allowing anyone to view global digital data sets of the ocean basins and visualise the plate tectonic evolution of the Earth.

Müller has published more than 250 peer-reviewed articles, of which some appear in prestigious journals such as Nature, Nature Geoscience, Nature Communications Science, and Geology. His map of the age of the ocean basins has been incorporated into Microsoft's digital Encarta atlas, and four textbooks exhibited in museums in the US, Japan, and Austria. In 2015, Müller contributed a plate tectonic animation to NOAA (US) Science on a Sphere program, utilising their interactive 3D spherical projection systems that are installed at museums, universities and schools.

In November 2019, he was listed among the top 14 highly cited researchers at the University of Sydney with h-index of 73 and more than 20,000 citations.

== Selected publications ==
- Müller, R. D., Cannon, J., Qin, X., Watson, R.J., Williams, S., Gurnis, M., Williams, S., Pfaffelmoser, T., Seton, M., Russell, S.H.J. and Zahirovic, S., 2018, GPlates – Building a Virtual Earth Through Deep Time, Geochemistry, Geophysics, Geosystems, 19, 2243–2261.
- Müller, R. D., Cannon, J., Williams, S. and Dutkiewicz, A., 2018, PyBacktrack 1.0: A Tool for Reconstructing Paleobathymetry on Oceanic and Continental Crust, Geochemistry, Geophysics, Geosystems, 19, 1898–1909, https://doi.org/10.1029/2017GC007313.
- Müller, R.D., Hassan, R., Gurnis, M., Flament, N. and Williams, S.E., 2018, Dynamic topography of passive continental margins and their hinterlands since the Cretaceous, Gondwana Research, 53, 225–251.
- Brune, S., Williams, S.E. and Müller, R.D., 2017, Potential links between continental rifting, CO2 degassing and climate change through geological time, Nature Geoscience, 10, 941-946
- Müller, R.D., Flament, N., Matthews, K.J., Williams, S.E., Gurnis, M., 2016, Formation of Australian continental margin highlands driven by plate–mantle interaction, Earth and Planetary Science Letters, 441, 60–70.
- Hassan, R, Müller, R.D., Gurnis, M., Williams, S.E. and Flament, N., 2016, A rapid burst in hotspot motion through the interaction of tectonics and deep mantle flow, Nature, 533, 239–242.
- Müller, R. D., Seton, M., Zahirovic, S., Williams, S.E., Matthews, K.J., Wright, N.M., Shephard, G.E., Maloney, K.Y., Barnett-Moore, N., Hosseinpour, M., Bower, D.J., Cannon, J., 2016, Ocean basin evolution and global-scale plate reorganization events since Pangea breakup, Annual Review of Earth and Planetary Science, Vol 44, 107–138.
- Sandwell, D.T., Müller, R.D., Smith, W.H.F., Garcia, E. and Francis, R., 2014, New global marine gravity model from CryoSat-2 and Jason-1 reveals buried tectonic structure, Science, 346, 65–67.
- Müller, R.D., Sdrolias, M., Gaina, C., Steinberger, B. and Heine, C., 2008, Long-term sea level fluctuations driven by ocean basin volume change, Science, 319, 1357–1362.
- Müller, R.D., Sdrolias, M., Gaina, C. and Roest, W.R., 2008, Age, spreading rates and spreading asymmetry of the world's ocean crust, Geochemistry, Geophysics, Geosystems, 9 (4), 1–19.
- Müller, R.D., Roest, W.R., and Royer, J.-Y., 1998, Asymmetric seafloor spreading caused by ridge-plume interactions, Nature, 396, 455–459.
- Müller, R.D., Roest, W.R., Royer, J.-Y., Gahagan, L.M. and Sclater, J.G., 1997, Digital isochrons of the world's ocean floor, Journal of Geophysical Research, 102, 3211–3214.
- Müller, R.D., Royer, J.-Y. and Lawver, L.A., 1993, Revised Plate Motions Relative to the Hotspots from Combined Atlantic and Indian Ocean Hotspot Tracks, Geology, 21, 275–278.
