= Peter Ziegler =

Swiss geologist

Peter Alfred Ziegler
- Born: 2 November 1928; Winterthur, Switzerland
- Died: 19 July 2013 (aged 84); Binningen, Switzerland
- Education: University of Zurich
- Scientific career
- Fields: Geology, Palaeogeography, Tectonics
- Workplaces: Shell, University of Basel, Vrije Universiteit Amsterdam
- Doctoral advisor: Rudolf Trümpy

Peter Alfred Ziegler (2 November 1928 – 19 July 2013) was a Swiss geologist, who made contributions to the understanding of the geological evolution of Europe and the North Atlantic borderlands, of intraplate tectonics and of plate tectonic controls on the evolution and hydrocarbon potential of sedimentary basins. Ziegler's career consists of 33 years as exploration geologist with the petroleum industry, 30 of which with Shell, and 20 years of university teaching and research.

== Life and work ==
Born in Winterthur, Ziegler took a PhD degree at the University of Zurich in spring 1955 and immediately joined the petroleum industry. Following three years of fieldwork and well sitting in Israel, Madagascar and the Algerian Sahara with American and French oil companies, he joined Shell Canada in Calgary. For six years he was engaged in the exploration of the Cordilleran foothills of British Columbia, the Northwest Territories and the Yukon, as well as of the Pacific shelf. This involved extensive helicopter-supported fieldwork. In view of a growing family, he converted from a structurally oriented field-geologist to a more sedentary, stratigraphic trap hunting subsurface-geologist and chalked-up his first natural gas discoveries in the Alberta down-dip reef belt. After guiding an airborne excursion through the Cordillera during the 1967 Devonian Symposium of Calgary, his guidebook, summarizing "The Development of Sedimentary Basins in Western and Arctic Canada", was published by the Alberta Society of Petroleum Geologists in 1969.

Ziegler was transferred to Shell International in the Netherlands on 1 January 1970, where he supervised Shell's exploration activities in the North Sea area. As the North Sea success story unfolded, Shell and its partners were rewarded with numerous important oil and gas discoveries, including the giant Brent, Statfjord, and Troll fields. Ziegler's responsibilities as exploration adviser expanded stepwise to all Shell companies in Europe, then South America, and ultimately worldwide.

Parallel to his operational responsibilities, Ziegler compiled regional geological data to gain a better understanding of the hydrocarbon potential of hitherto little explored basins on the Atlantic seaboard and of basins behind the Iron Curtain. Presentations at various conferences and symposia prompted academia to propose to Shell to publish his set of palaeogeographic/palaeotectonic maps. In 1982 Ziegler's Geological Atlas of Western and Central Europe was published. In this volume he retraced the geological history, depositional environments and tectonics of Europe north of the Alps in greater detail than had ever been done before. In the same line, the American Association of Petroleum Geologists invited Ziegler to tour the United States and Canada in 1986-1987 as distinguished lecturer, speaking on the Evolution of the Arctic-North Atlantic and Western Tethys.

He died on 19 July 2013 in Binningen, Switzerland.

== Scientific career ==
In autumn 1988 Ziegler retired from Shell and returned with his wife to Switzerland where he joined the University of Basel as lecturer. In short succession he published with Shell's support in late 1988 the AAPG Memoir 43, entitled "Evolution of the Arctic-North Atlantic and Western Tethys", in 1989 a volume published by the Royal Geological and Mining Society of the Netherlands on "Evolution of Laurussia - A Study in Late Palaeozoic Plate Tectonics" and in 1990 for Shell's 100 years of Exploration Jubilee the 2nd edition of his "Geological Atlas of Western and Central Europe". In addition he carried out consulting work, lectured regularly on Shell's behalf at the Vrije Universiteit Amsterdam, and participated in international research endeavors, such as the International Lithosphere Program (leader of working group 3: Intra-Plate Tectonics 1985-90: Bureau member 1991-94), EUROPROBE (1990–2002), the IGCP-369 Comparative evolution of Peri-Tethyan Rift Basins Project (1994–99) and the TRANSMED Atlas Project (2000–04). He initiated and coordinated the transnational EUCOR-URGENT Project (1999–2008) that dealt with the evolution and neotectonics of the Upper Rhine Graben. He contributed materially to the development of the follow-up TOPO-EUROPE Project, which addresses the neotectonic and topographic evolution of Europe.

Ziegler published widely in international journals and in thematic volumes on processes controlling extensional and compressional intraplate tectonics and on the evolution of the lithosphere. His publications found wide recognition and contributed enormously to narrowing the gap between academia and the industry. His work changed the way geologists look at depositional systems and tectonic processes controlling the evolution of sedimentary basins.

== Awards ==
In 1992 Ziegler was appointed as Honorary Lecturer at University of Basel and in 1996 as Titular Professor for Global Geology. He was awarded Honorary Doctor Degrees by the Moscow State University (1997) and the Technical University Delft (2001). He was a recipient of the Foumarier medal of the Belgian Geological Society, the van Waterschot van der Gracht medal of the Royal Geological and Mining Society of the Netherlands, the William Smith medal of the Geological Society of London, the Neville George medal of the Geological Society of Glasgow, the Stephan Müller medal of the European Geosciences Union, the Leopold von Buch medal of the German Geological Society and the Leonidovici Kaptsa medal of the Russian Academy of Natural Sciences. From the American Association of Petroleum Geologists he received the Robert Dott sr. Memorial Award for the publication of his Memoir 43, and later the Special Commendation Award for his regional synthesis of the geological evolution of Europe and for being a lively catalyst of the dialogue among Earth Scientists.

== Memberships ==
Ziegler was elected a foreign member of the Royal Netherlands Academy of Arts and Sciences in 1984. He became a member of the Academia Europaea in 1990. Ziegler was also a member of the Polish Academy of Arts and Sciences and the Russian Academy of Natural Sciences. He was a life member of the Bureau of the International Lithosphere Program and an honorary member of the Geological Society of London, the European Geosciences Union, the Geological Society of Poland and the American Association of Petroleum Geologists.

== Honours ==
On the occasion of his 80th birthday the Swiss Geological Society honoured Ziegler with a symposium on the theme "Deep Earth - from Crust to Core", held in Lugano on 23 November 2008.

== Selected publications ==
- Ziegler, P.A. (1969). "The Development of Sedimentary Basins in Western and Arctic Canada". Alberta Soc. Petrol. Geol. Spec. Publ.: 89.
- Ziegler, P.A. (1975). "Geologic evolution of the North Sea and its tectonic framework". American Association of Petroleum Geologists Bulletin. 59: 1073–1097.
- Ziegler, P.A. (1980). "Northwestern Europe: Subsidence patterns of Post-Variscan Basins". In Cogné, J.; Slansky, M. (eds.). Géologie de l'Europe du Précambrien aux bassins sédimentaire post-hercyniens. Mém. BRGM. Vol. 108. pp. 249–280.
- Ziegler, P.A. (1982). Geological Atlas of Western and Central Europe. Amsterdam: Shell Int. Petrol. Mij. B.V. and Elsevier Science Publishers. pp. 130 and 40 encl. ISBN 978-0-444-42084-8.
- Ziegler, P.A. (1986). "Geodynamic model for the Paleozoic crustal consolidation of Western and Central Europe". Tectonophysics. 126 (2–4): 303–328. Bibcode:1986Tectp.126..303Z. doi:10.1016/0040-1951(86)90236-2.
- Ziegler, P.A. (1987). "Late Cretaceous and Cenozoic intra-plate compressional deformations in the Alpine foreland - a geodynamic model". Tectonophysics. 137 (1–4): 389–420. Bibcode:1987Tectp.137..389Z. doi:10.1016/0040-1951(87)90330-1.
- Ziegler, P.A. (1988). "Evolution of the Arctic-North Atlantic and the Western Tethys". American Association of Petroleum Geologists Memoir. 43.
- Ziegler, P.A. (1989). "Evolution of Laurussia - A Study in Late Palaeozoic Plate Tectonics". Royal Geological and Mining Society of the Netherlands. Dordrecht: Kluwer.
- Ziegler, P.A. (1990). Geological Atlas of Western and Central Europe (2 ed.). Shell Int. Petrol. Mij. B.V., dist. by Geol. Soc. Publ. House Bath. pp. 239, 56 encl. ISBN 978-0-444-42084-8.
- Ziegler, P.A., ed. (1992). "Geodynamics of Rifting". Reprints from Tectonophysics. Amsterdam, London, New York, Tokyo: Elsevier: 901.
- Ziegler, P.A. (1993). "Plate moving mechanisms: their relative importance". J. Geol. Soc. 150 (5). London: 927–940. Bibcode:1993JGSoc.150..927Z. doi:10.1144/gsjgs.150.5.0927. S2CID 140705712.
- Ziegler, P.A. (1994). "Cenozoic rift systems of Western and Central Europe: an overview". Geol. Mijnbow. 73: 99–127.
- Ziegler, P.A.; Cloetingh, S.; van Wees, J-D. (1995). "Dynamics of Intra-plate Compressional Deformation: The Alpine Foreland and other Examples". Tectonophysics. 252 (1–4): 7–59. Bibcode:1995Tectp.252....7Z. doi:10.1016/0040-1951(95)00102-6. hdl:1871/8344.
- Ziegler, P.A.; Horvàth, F., eds. (1996). "Structure and prospects of Alpine Basins and Forelands". Peri-Tethys Mem. 2, Mém. Mus. Natn. Hist. Nat. (170). Paris: 547.
- Ziegler, P.A.; van Wees, J-D.; Cloetingh, S. (1998). "Mechanical controls on collision-related compressional intraplate deformation". Tectonophysics. 300 (1–4): 103–129. Bibcode:1998Tectp.300..103Z. doi:10.1016/S0040-1951(98)00236-4.
- Ziegler, P.A. (1999). B. Durand; L. Jolivet; F. Horvath; M. Séranne (eds.). "Petroleum systems of Alpine-Mediterranean foldbelts and basins". Geological Society, London, Special Publications. 156 (1): 517–540. Bibcode:1999GSLSP.156..517Z. doi:10.1144/GSL.SP.1999.156.01.23. S2CID 128883410.
- Ziegler, P.A.; Cloetingh, S.; Guiraud, R.; Stampfli, G.M. (2001). "PeriTethyan Platforms: Dynamics of Rifting and Basin Inversion". In Ziegler, P.A.; Cavazza, W.; Robertson, A.F.H.; Crasquin-Soleau, S. (eds.). Peri-Tethyan Rift/Wrench Basins and Passive Margins. Paris. pp. 9–49.
- Ziegler, P.A.; Bertotti, G.; Cloetingh, S. (2002). "Dynamic processes controlling foreland development - the role of mechanical (de)coupling of orogenic wedges and forelands". In Bertotti, G.; Schulmann, K.; Cloetingh, S. (eds.). Continental Collision and the Tectono-Sedimentary Evolution of Forelands. pp. 17–56.
- Ziegler, P.A.; Cloetingh, S. (2004). "Dynamic processes controlling evolution of rifted basins". Earth-Science Reviews. 64 (1–2): 1–50. Bibcode:2004ESRv...64....1Z. doi:10.1016/S0012-8252(03)00041-2.
- Ziegler, P.A.; Schumacher, M.E.; Dèzes, P.; van Wees, J.-D.; Cloetingh, S. (2004). Wilson, M.; Neumann, E-R.; Davies, G.R.; Timmerman, M.J.; Heeremans, M.; Larsen, B.T (eds.). "Post-Variscan evolution of the lithosphere in the Rhine Graben area: Constraints from subsidence modelling". Geological Society, London, Special Publications. 223 (1): 289–317. Bibcode:2004GSLSP.223..289Z. doi:10.1144/GSL.SP.2004.223.01.13. S2CID 129495948.
- Cavazza, W.; Roure, F.; Ziegler, P.A. (2004). "The Mediterranean Area and the Surrounding Regions: Active Processes, Remnants of Former Tethys Oceans and Related Thrust Belts". In W. Cavazza; F. Roure; W. Spakman; G.M. Stampfli; P.A. Ziegler (eds.). The TRANSMED Atlas – The Mediterranean Region from Crust to Mantle. Berlin, Heidelberg: Springer. pp. 1–29. ISBN 978-3-540-22181-4.
- Dèzes, P.; Schmid, S.M.; Ziegler, P.A. (2004). "Evolution of the European Cenozoic Rift System: interaction of the Alpine and Pyrenean orogens with their foreland lithosphere". Tectonophysics. 389 (1–2): 1–33. Bibcode:2004Tectp.389....1D. doi:10.1016/j.tecto.2004.06.011.
- Ziegler, P.A. (2005). "Europe: Permian to Recent Evolution". In R.C. Selley; L.R.M. Cocks; I.R. Plimer (eds.). Encyclopedia of Geology. Elsevier. pp. 102–125.
- Ziegler, P.A.; Dèzes, P. (2005). J.H. Behrmann; P.A. Ziegler; S.M. Schmid; B. Heck, M. Granet (eds.). "Evolution of the lithosphere in the area of the Rhine Rift System" (PDF). International Journal of Earth Sciences. 94 (4): 594–614. Bibcode:2005IJEaS..94..594Z. doi:10.1007/s00531-005-0474-3. S2CID 128614449.
- Ziegler, P.A.; Dèzes, P. (2006). D.G. Gee; R.A. Stephenson (eds.). "Crustal evolution of Western and Central Europe". Geological Society, London, Memoirs. 32 (1): 43–56. Bibcode:2006GSLMm..32...43Z. doi:10.1144/GSL.MEM.2006.032.01.03. S2CID 73602279.
- Ziegler, P.A.; Dèzes, P. (2007). "Neogene uplift of Variscan Massifs in the Alpine foreland: Timing and controlling mechanisms". Global and Planetary Change. 58 (1–4): 237–269. doi:10.1016/j.gloplacha.2006.12.004.
- Cloetingh, S.; Ziegler, P.A. (2007). Watts, A.B.; Schubert, G. (eds.). "Tectonic Models for the Evolution of Sedimentary Basins". Treatise on Geophysics. 6: 485–611. doi:10.1016/B978-044452748-6/00109-7. hdl:1874/330364.
- Cloetingh, S.A.P.L.; Ziegler, P.A.; 31 others and TOPO-EUROPE Working Group (2007). "TOPO-EUROPE: The geoscience of coupled deep Earth-surface processes" (PDF). Global and Planetary Change. 58 (1–4): 1–118. Bibcode:2007GPC....58....1C. doi:10.1016/j.gloplacha.2007.02.008.
- Ziegler, P.A.; Fraefel, M. (2009). "Response of drainage systems to Neogene evolution of the Jura fold-thrust belt and Upper Rhine Graben" (PDF). Swiss Journal of Geosciences. 102 (1): 57–75. Bibcode:2009SwJG..102...57Z. doi:10.1007/s00015-009-1306-4. S2CID 128574908.
