= Trond Helge Torsvik =

Norwegian professor of geophysics

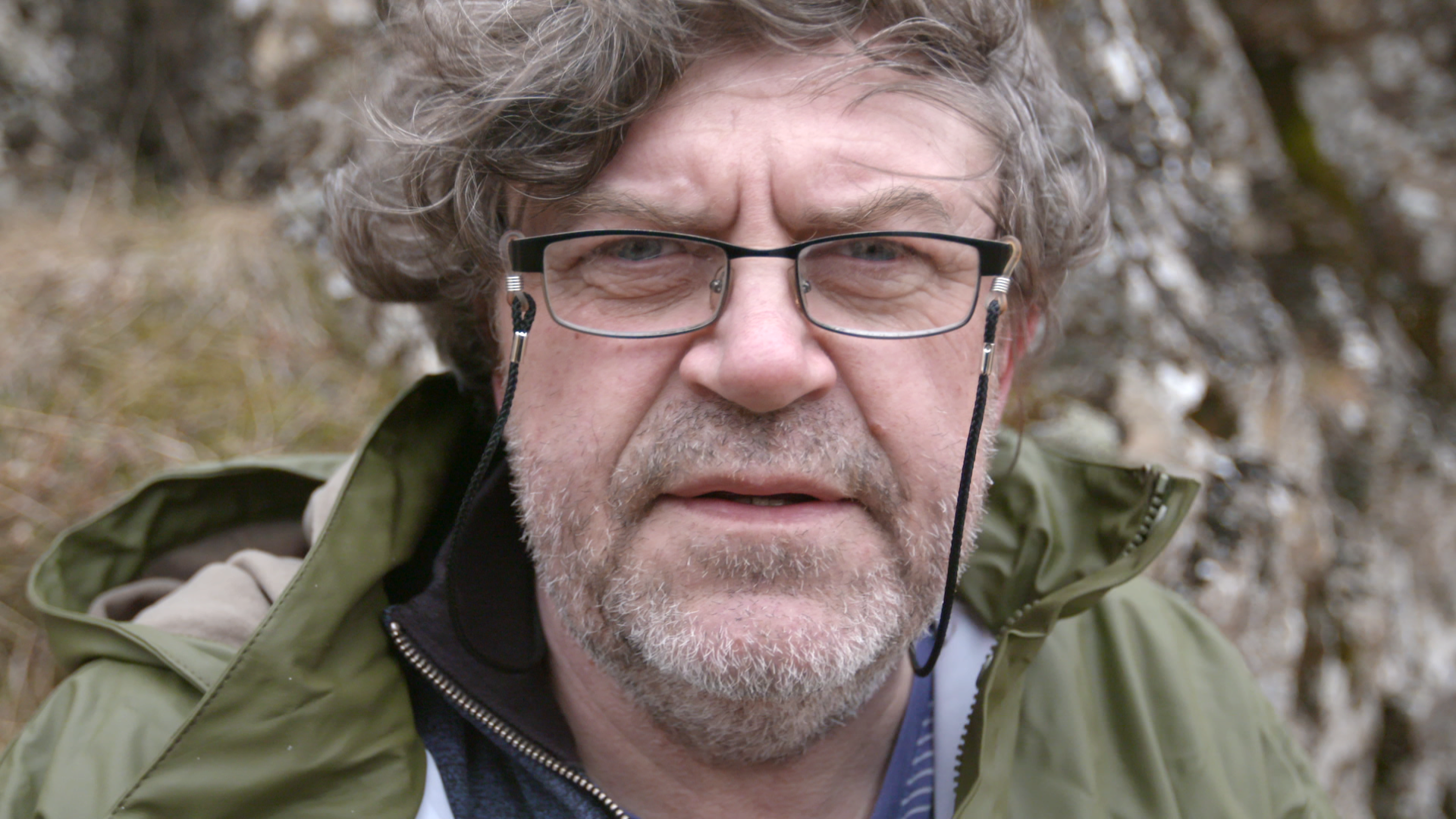
- Born: October 12, 1957 (age 68); Norway
- Education: University of Bergen (Ph.D. 1985)
- Awards: Wollaston Medal (2024); Arthur Holmes Medal (2016)
- Scientific career
- Fields: Geophysicist

Trond Helge Torsvik (born October 12 1957) is a Norwegian professor of geophysics at the University of Oslo. He directs the Centre for Earth Evolution and Dynamics. In 2015 Torsvik received the Leopold von Buch award for his outstanding contributions to the understanding of geodynamics. The prize is awarded by the German Geological Society. In 2016 he also received the Arthur Holmes Medal & Honorary Membership from the European Geosciences Union.

== Education ==
Torsvik received a Ph.D. from the University of Bergen in 1985. After this he was a researcher at the University of Bergen and the Norwegian Geological Survey. Also he was a guest lecturer at the University of Michigan (1993–1994) and a guest lecturer at the University of Lund (1999–2001). Since 2007 he has been professor at the University of Oslo studying the physics of geological processes. He was assistant professor at the University of the Witwatersrand in South Africa in 2004.

== Other membership ==
He joined the Royal Norwegian Society of Sciences and Letters in 1993, the Norwegian Academy of Science and Letters in 1996, the American Geophysical Union in 1999, the Academia Europaea in 2005 and the Royal Danish Academy of Sciences and Letters in 2008 .
