= Jacques Malavieille =

French geologist (born 1953)

- Born: 12 October 1953; Mende
- Occupation: Geophysicist
- Employer: University of Montpellier
- Awards: Stephan Mueller Medal (2012)

Jacques Malavieille (French pronunciation: [ʒak malavjɛj]; born October 12, 1953, in Mende, Lozère) is a French geologist. He is known for research combining geological fieldwork with analog modeling, and with some computer modeling, for scientific understanding of lithospheric deformation.

== Biography ==
Jacques Malavieille grew up in that part of the valley of the river Lot located in the department of Lozère. As a small boy, he enjoyed searching for rocks and fossils in the mountainous region of the Massif Central. At Montpellier 2 University (Université de Montpellier II), he graduated in 1982 with a PhD in tectonics and in 1987 with a Habilitation à diriger des recherches. His PhD thesis Étude tectonique et microtectonique de la déformation ductile dans de grands chevauchements crustaux : exemples des Alpes Franco-Italiennes et de la Corse was supervised by Maurice Mattauer (1928–2009). Malavieille's habilitation thesis, supervised by Mattauer, is entitled Les mécanismes d’amincissement d’une croûte épaissie, les "Metamorphic Core Complexes du Basin and Range" (USA). Malavieille was employed by the CNRS from 1982 to 1994 as a Chargé de recherches (CR, Scientist) and from 1994 to 2002 as Directeur de recherches (DR, Senior Scientist). He was from 1999 to 2003 Directeur du Laboratoire Géophysique, Tectonique et Sédimentologie (UMR 5573 of the CNRS) and from 2003 to 2012 Directeur de recherches 1^{ère} classe. From 2012 to the present, Malvieille has held the appointment Directeur de recherches Classe Exceptionnelle (DRCE) at Géosciences Montpellier of Montpellier 2 University.He is presently “emeritus“ at CNRS.

Malavieille is the author or co-author of over 120 peer-reviewed, scientific articles. Several of his articles have over 600 citations. He specializes in research on deformation of lithosphere underlying orogenic domains of Earth's continents. He and his co-workers have done extensive field in the French Alps, eastern Asia, and the Tibetan Plateau. He has also done fieldwork in Taiwan, which is located on a convergent boundary between the Philippine Sea Plate and the Eurasian Plate, and in the Rocky Mountains of the US and Canada.

As a graduate student, Malavieille studied structural geology and how crustal deformation is related to lithospheric deformation. In the early 1980s, his research in Corsica and the western Alps linked lineations and mountain formation, promoted recognition of similar structures elsewhere, and showed how small-scale structures influence the large-scale kinematics of mountain ranges. In the 1980s, his research on strain fringes and asymmetric boundins provided new insights on the kinematics of geological structures. Some of his early fieldwork in the French Variscan orogenic belt and North America's Basin and Range Province contributed significantly to knowledge about metamorphic core complexes. Malavieille gained an international reputation for pioneering applications of analog modeling to scientific understanding of how fold-and-thrust belts and accretionary wedges develop. In Montpellier, he was essential in establishing an internationally renowned center for analog modeling in geology. Such analog models use sands and powders. His research has contributed to "understanding of accretionary wedges, seamount collision, basal underplating, tectonic erosion, oblique accretion." His recent research involves the "impact of surface processes and climate on the dynamics of orogenic wedges".

Malavieille was awarded in 2001 the Prix Pierre Pruvost of the Société Géologique de France. In 2012 he received the Stephan Mueller Medal of the European Geosciences Union. In 2012 he shared, with co-author Elena Konstantinovskaya, the Geological Association of Canada's Dave Elliott Best Paper Prize. The prize for best paper in structural geology and tectonics published in 2011 honored their article Thrust wedges with décollement levels and syntectonic erosion: A view from analog models. In 2014 he received the Prix Paul Fourmarier of the Royal Academies for Science and the Arts of Belgium. In 2020, the “Prix Dolomieu“ (Grand prix de l’Académie des Sciences, Paris) for works on orogenesis.

He is the father of three sons.

== Selected publications ==
- Malavieille, J. (1984). "Modelisation experimentale des chevauchements imbriques; application aux chaines de montagnes". Bulletin de la Société Géologique de France: 129–138. doi:10.2113/gssgfbull.S7-XXVI.1.129.
- Malavieille, J.; Guihot, P.; Costa, S.; Lardeaux, J. M.; Gardien, V. (1990). "Collapse of the thickened Variscan crust in the French Massif Central: Mont Pilat extensional shear zone and St. Etienne Late Carboniferous basin". Tectonophysics. 177 (1): 139. Bibcode:1990Tectp.177..139M. doi:10.1016/0040-1951(90)90278-G.
- Echtler, H.; Malavieille, J. (1990). "Extensional tectonics, basement uplift and Stephano-Permian collapse basin in a late Variscan metamorphic core complex (Montagne Noire, Southern Massif Central)". Tectonophysics. 177 (1): 125. Bibcode:1990Tectp.177..125E. doi:10.1016/0040-1951(90)90277-F.
- Malavieille, Jacques (1993). "Late orogenic extension in mountain belts: insights from the Basin and Range and the late Paleozoic Variscan belt". Tectonics. 12 (5): 1115. Bibcode:1993Tecto..12.1115M. doi:10.1029/93TC01129.
- Lallemand, Serge E.; Schnürle, Philippe; Malavieille, Jacques (1994). "Coulomb theory applied to accretionary and nonaccretionary wedges: Possible causes for tectonic erosion and/or frontal accretion". Journal of Geophysical Research. 99 (B6): 12033–12055. Bibcode:1994JGR....9912033L. doi:10.1029/94JB00124.
- Chemenda, Alexander I.; Mattauer, Maurice; Malavieille, Jacques; Bokun, Alexander N. (1995). "A mechanism for syn-collisional rock exhumation and associated normal faulting: results from physical modelling". Earth and Planetary Science Letters. 132 (1): 225. Bibcode:1995E&PSL.132..225C. doi:10.1016/0012-821X(95)00042-B.
- Dominguez, S.; Lallemand, S. E.; Malavieille, J.; von Huene, R. (1998). "Upper plate deformation associated with seamount subduction". Tectonophysics. 293 (3): 207. Bibcode:1998Tectp.293..207D. doi:10.1016/S0040-1951(98)00086-9.
- Gutscher, M.-A; Malavieille, J.; Lallemand, S.; Collot, J.-Y (1999). "Tectonic segmentation of the North Andean margin: Impact of the Carnegie Ridge collision". Earth and Planetary Science Letters. 168 (3–4): 255–270. Bibcode:1999E&PSL.168..255G. doi:10.1016/S0012-821X(99)00060-6.
- Dominguez, S.; Malavieille, J.; Lallemand, S. E. (2000). "Deformation of accretionary wedges in response to seamount subduction: Insights from sandbox experiments" (PDF). Tectonics. 19 (1): 182. Bibcode:2000Tecto..19..182D. doi:10.1029/1999TC900055. S2CID 55287077.
- Armijo, Rolando; Pondard, Nicolas; Meyer, Bertrand; Uçarkus, Gulsen; De Lépinay, Bernard Mercier; Malavieille, Jacques; Dominguez, Stéphane; Gustcher, Marc-André; Schmidt, Sabine; Beck, Christian; Ćagatay, Namik; Ćakir, Ziyadin; Imren, Caner; Eris, Kadir; Natalin, Boris; ã-Zalaybey, Serdar; Tolun, Leyla; Lefèvre, Irène; Seeber, Leonardo; Gasperini, Luca; Rangin, Claude; Emre, Omer; Sarikavak, Kerim (2005). "Submarine fault scarps in the Sea of Marmara pull-apart (North Anatolian Fault): Implications for seismic hazard in Istanbul". Geochemistry, Geophysics, Geosystems. 6 (6). Bibcode:2005GGG.....6.6009A. doi:10.1029/2004GC000896. S2CID 39090311.
- Lagabrielle, Yves; Goddéris, Yves; Donnadieu, Yannick; Malavieille, Jacques; Suarez, Manuel (2009). "The tectonic history of Drake Passage and its possible impacts on global climate" (PDF). Earth and Planetary Science Letters. 279 (3–4): 197. Bibcode:2009E&PSL.279..197L. doi:10.1016/j.epsl.2008.12.037.
- Malavieille, Jacques (January 2010). "Impact of erosion, sedimentation, and structural heritage on the structure and kinematics of orogenic wedges: Analog models and case studies". GSA Today. 20 (1): 4–10. doi:10.1130/GSATG48A.1.
- Graveleau, Fabien; Malavieille, Jacques; Dominguez, Stéphane (2012). "Experimental modelling of orogenic wedges: A review". Tectonophysics. 538: 1. Bibcode:2012Tectp.538....1G. doi:10.1016/j.tecto.2012.01.027.
