= Celâl Şengör =

Turkish scientist, geologist

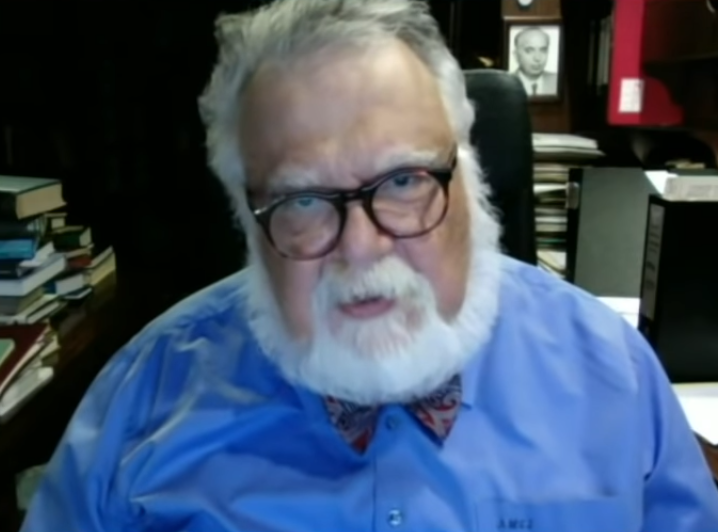
- Şengör in 2021
- Born: Ali Mehmet Celâl Şengör; 24 March 1955 (age 71); Istanbul, Turkey
- Education: Robert College; State University of New York at Albany (BA, MA, PhD)
- Occupation: Professor of geology (retired)
- Employer: Istanbul Technical University
- Known for: Tectonics of Turkey and Asia
- Spouse: Oya Maltepe (m. 1986)
- Children: 1
- Awards: Geological Society's President's Awards (1984); TÜBİTAK Science Award (1986); Rammal Medal (1999); Collège de France Award (1998); Bigsby Medal (1999); Gustav-Steinmann-Medaille (2010); Mary C. Rabbitt Award (2017); Arthur Holmes Medal (2018); Eduard Suess Medal (2020); Akiho Miyashiro Award (2025)
- Scientific career
- Doctoral advisor: John Frederick Dewey

Ali Mehmet Celâl Şengör (Turkish: [ˈali ˈmehmet ˈdʒeɫal ˈʃænɟœɾ]; born 24 March 1955) is a Turkish geologist. He is retired from the faculty at Istanbul Technical University, Department of Geological Engineering.

Şengör is a foreign member of the American Philosophical Society, Academia Europaea (1990), the United States National Academy of Sciences (2000), Russian Academy of Sciences (2006), German National Academy of Sciences Leopoldina (2012), Austrian Academy of Sciences (2015), Leibniz Society of Sciences (2016), European Geosciences Union (2018), Serbian Academy of Sciences and Arts (2018), Accademia nazionale delle scienze (2023), Bavarian Academy of Sciences and Humanities (2024), and Chinese Academy of Sciences (2025). He is a recipient of Gustav-Steinmann-Medaille — the highest distinction of the Geologische Vereinigung e.V.

== Personal life ==
Celal Şengör was born on 24 March 1955, in Istanbul, to a muhacir family from Rumelia. After graduating from Robert College, he received his BS (1978), MS (1979), PhD (1982) degrees from the State University of New York, Albany. He writes a weekly popular science column in the center-left daily Cumhuriyet. He is married and has a son. Şengör has been diagnosed with Asperger syndrome.

== Controversies ==
Şengör is vocal in his support of the Turkish military and the 1980 military coup in Turkey. In a very controversial interview published on the website of Radikal newspaper, Şengör argued that the root cause of Turkey's political problems was the lack of an aristocratic class, which would lead the society in cultural life and politics. According to Şengör, the Turkish military is the only elite class in society, and their refinement and education make them qualified for a rule. Most controversially, he expressed his unqualified approval of every policy of the military regime between 1980 and 1982 in Turkey by asserting that being forced to eat excrement should not be regarded as torture. But later in his statement he stated that it would not be considered torture as it was not an ongoing action. Şengör later apologized for his remarks and claimed that he was misunderstood.

Şengör also stated in an interview that he preferred monarchy to a republic or democracy, especially for judicial independence and against corruption. In this interview, referring to Plato for the ideal political system, he advocated the rule of a cultured elite against the rule of ordinary people.

== Recognition ==
In 1988, he received an honorary Doctorate from the University of Neuchâtel. In 2012, he became a foreign member of the German Academy of Sciences Leopoldina.

=== Fossils named after Şengör ===
- Sengoerina argandi ALTINER, 1999: Altıner, D., 1999, Sengoerina argandi, n. gen., n. sp., and its position in the evolution of Late Permian biseriamminid foraminifers: Micropaleontology, v. 45, pp. 215–22.
- Dicapnuchosphaera sengori TEKİN, 1999: Tekin, U. K., 1999, Biostratigraphy and Systematics of Late Middle to Late Triassic Radiolarians from the Taurus Mountains and Ankara Region, Turkey: Geologisch-Paläontologische Mitteilungen Innsbruck, Sonderband 5, pp. 296 (see p. 75 and plate 5, figs. 3–6).
- Sengoerichthys ottoman JANVIER, CLÉMENT and CLOUTIER, 2007: Janvier, P., Clément, G. and Cloutier, R., 2007, A primitive megalichthyid fish (Sarcopterygii, Tetrapodomorpha) from the Upper Devonian of Turkey and its biogeographical implications: Geodiversitas, v. 29, pp. 249–268.

== Publications ==
=== Books ===
- 1982 (with A. Miyashiro and K. Aki) Orogeny: J. Wiley & Sons, Chichester, 242 pp.
- 1984 The Cimmeride Orogenic System and the Tectonics of Eurasia: Geological Society of America Special Paper 195, xi+82 pp.
- 1989 (Editor). Tectonic Evolution of the Tethyan Region: Kluwer Academic Publishers, Dordrecht.
- 1990 (Co-editor with J.F. Dewey, Ian G. Gass, G.B. Curry, and N.B.W. Harris) Allochthonous Terranes: Phil. Trans. Roy. Soc. London, v. 331, pp. 455–647.
- 1992 Plate Tectonics and Orogeny - A Tethyan Perspective: Fu Dan University Press, Shanghai, 4 +2 + 182 pp. (in Chinese; this book is a combined translation of items 88 and 97 in the Papers section plus a preface added on 6 July 1991)
- 1998 (with N. Görür, A. Okay, N. Özgül, O. Tüysüz, M. Sakınç, R. Akkök, E., Yiğitbaş, T. Genç, S. Örçen, T. Ercan, B. Akyürek, F. Şaroğlu) Türkiye'nin Triyas-Miyosen Paleocoğrafya Atlası, editör: Naci Görür (Triassic to Miocene Palaeogeographic Atlas of Turkey, Naci Görür, editor): İstanbul Teknik Üniversitesi, Maden Fakültesi, Jeoloji Mühendisliği Bölümü, Genel Jeoloji Anabilim Dalı TÜBİTAK—Global Tektonik Araştırma Ünitesi ve Maden Tetkik ve Arama Genel Müdürlüğü, Jeoloji Etütleri Dairesi, Ankara, [IV]+41pp.+30 pp. of maps and sections, oblong elephant folio.
- 2001 Is the Present the Key to the Past or the Past the Key to the Present? James Hutton and Adam Smith versus Abraham Gottlob Werner and Karl Marx in Interpreting History: Geological Society of America Special Paper 355, x+51 pp.
- 2001 (with X. Le Pichon and E. Demirbağ) Marine Atlas of the Sea of Marmara (Turkey) IFREMER, Paris, 13 pp. of Explanatory text, 11 foldout maps.
- 2003 The Large Wavelength Deformations of the Lithosphere: Materials for a history of the evolution of thought from the earliest times to plate tectonics: Geological Society of America Memoir 196, xvii+347 pp.+ 3 folded plates in pocket
- 2004 Yaşamın Evrimi Fikrinin Darwin Dönemi Sonuna Kadarki Tarihi (History of the Idea of the Evolution of Life to the End of Darwin's Period): İTÜ Yayınevi, İstanbul, 187 pp.
- 2005 Une Autre Histoire de la Tectonique: Leçons Inaugurales du Collège de France, Fayard, Paris, 79 pp.
- 2006 99 Sayfada İstanbul Depremi (The İstanbul Earthquake in 99 Pages): İş Bankası Kültür Yayınları, İstanbul, 99 pp.
- 2009 (with S. Atayman) The Permian Extinction and the Tethys: An Exercise in Global Geology: Geological Society of America Special Paper 448, x+96 pp.
- 2009 Globale Geologie und ihr Einfluss auf das Denken von Eduard Suess Der Katastrophismus Uniformitarianismus-Streit: Scripta Geo-Historica, v. 2, 181 pp.
- 2009 (with B. A. Natal’in) Rifti Mira (uchebno-spavochnoye posobie): Geokart, Moskva, 187 pp. (Russian translation of item 166 below plus a preface)
- 2014 (with Thomas Hofman, Günter Blöschl, Lois Lammerhuber, Werner Piller) The Face of the Earth: The Legacy of Eduard Suess: Edition Lammerhuber, 104 pp.
- 2020 Revising the Revisions: James Hutton's Reputation Among Geologists in the Late Eighteenth and Nineteenth Centuries: The Geologcal Society of America.
