= Sierd Cloetingh =

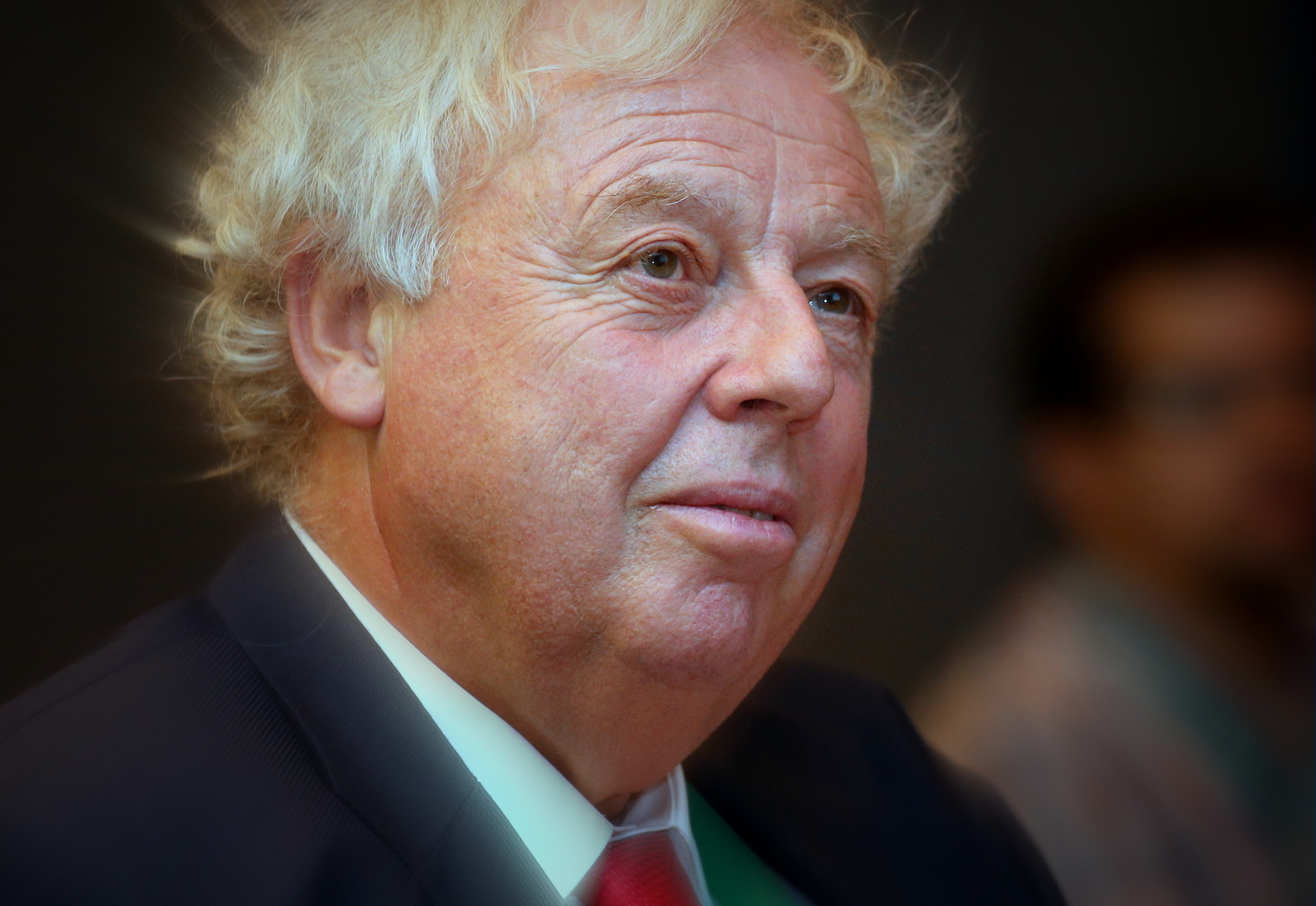
- Born: 20 August 1950 (age 75); Groningen, Netherlands
- Awards: Arthur Holmes Medal (2013)
- Scientific career
- Fields: Geophysics, Tectonics
- Institutions: Utrecht University

Sierd A.P.L. Cloetingh (born 1950) is Professor of Earth Sciences at Utrecht University. From 2014 to 2021, he was President of the Academia Europaea.

== Education ==
- BSc degree geology with physics and mathematics, University of Groningen (supervisors Professors Philip Kuenen and L.M.J.U. van Straaten): March 1972
- MSc degree geophysics with minors in structural geology and numerical mathematics (cum laude; supervisor Prof. dr. N.J. Vlaar), University of Utrecht: January 1977
- PhD degree geophysics University of Utrecht (Thesis: Evolution of passive margins and initiation of subduction zones; Promoter: Prof. dr. N.J. Vlaar): December 1982.

== Publications ==
He published more than 300 papers in international peer-reviewed journals and has been promoter of more than 70 PhD students of 18 different nationalities. He served the Earth Science community in various functions, including Presidency of the European Geophysical Society. He is currently the President of the International Lithosphere Programme, Editor-in-Chief of the International Journal “Global and Planetary Change” and Chairman of the Scientific Committee of the ESF Large Scale Collaborative Research Programme (EUROCORES) TOPO-EUROPE.

== Honours ==
Cloetingh has received honorary doctorates from five European universities and numerous honours and awards, including the Stephan Mueller Medal, Arthur Holmes Medal and honorary membership of the European Geosciences Union, Fellow and Honorary Fellow of the American Geophysical Union and the Geological Society of America, the Leopold von Buch Medal of the German Geological Society and the Alexander von Humboldt Research Award.

Cloetingh was elected member of the Royal Netherlands Academy of Arts and Sciences in 1998. He became corresponding member of the Heidelberg Academy of Sciences and Humanities in 2005 and of the Bavarian Academy of Sciences and Humanities in 2008. Cloeting is also Foreign member of the Norwegian Academy of Science and Letters, the Royal Danish Academy of Sciences and Letters, and the German Academy for Technical Sciences, Acatech. He was distinguished in 2006 as Chevalier de Légion d'honneur and in 2014 as Knight of the Order of the Netherlands Lion for his contributions to science and European scientific cooperation in research and education.

He was elected member of Academia Europaea in 1993 and served Academia Europaea as Chair of the Earth and Marine and Earth and Cosmic Sciences Sections and as vice-president. In 2014 he was elected as President of Academia Europaea. He is a member of the Scientific Council of the ERC since 2009. In 2017, he was appointed President of the COST Association. In December 2018, he became chair of the Board of SAPEA, part of the European Commission's Scientific Advice Mechanism.

== Notes ==
As of 10 October 2014, this article is derived in whole or in part from ae.info.org. The copyright holder has licensed the content in a manner that permits reuse under CC BY-SA 3.0 and GFDL. All relevant terms must be followed.
