= Mathilde Cannat =

Marine geologist

- Born: 1962 (age 63–64)
- Education: Université de Nantes
- Awards: Murchison Medal (2023)
- Scientific career
- Workplaces: Institut de Physique du Globe de Paris
- Thesis: Cinématique de charriages ophiolitiques (Klamath, Semail, Groix) et convergence océanique (1983)

Mathilde Cannat is a French geologist known for her research on the formation of oceanic crust and the tectonic and magmatic changes of mid-ocean ridges.

== Education and career ==
Cannat earned her Ph.D. in 1983 from University of Nantes where she worked on ophiolites and tectonic processes. Following her Ph.D., she was a postdoc at Durham University and then she joined the French National Centre for Scientific Research (CNRS) in 1986. In 1992 she obtained a position at the Pierre and Marie Curie University (University of Paris 6) where she remained until she moved to a position at the Institut de Physique du Globe de Paris in 2001.

In 2014, Cannat was elected a fellow of the American Geophysical Union who cited her "for fundamental contributions to understanding the accretion of the oceanic lithosphere and crust".

== Research ==
Cannat's research centers on magmatism, changes in the oceanic crust, particularly at mid-ocean ridges. Her early research was on ophiolites in California and western Alps, and she used her research on ophiolites to understand processes on the seafloor. In the mid-1990s, Cannat described the formation of the seafloor at slow-spreading mid-ocean ridges, a model posing that new seafloor is formed from rocks that have been tectonically uplifted from the mantle. This idea differed from the processes described for fast-spreading mid-ocean ridges and, in a 2018 interview, she described this as her greatest achievement. Cannat's research can rely on in situ observations, and she has made seventeen deep-sea dives aboard the Nautile.

=== Selected publications ===
- Cannat, Mathilde (1996). "How thick is the magmatic crust at slow spreading oceanic ridges?". Journal of Geophysical Research: Solid Earth. 101 (B2): 2847–2857. Bibcode:1996JGR...101.2847C. doi:10.1029/95JB03116. ISSN 2156-2202.
- Cannat, Mathilde; Sauter, Daniel; Mendel, Véronique; Ruellan, Etienne; Okino, Kyoko; Escartin, Javier; Combier, Violaine; Baala, Mohamad (2006-07-01). "Modes of seafloor generation at a melt-poor ultraslow-spreading ridge". Geology. 34 (7): 605–608. Bibcode:2006Geo....34..605C. doi:10.1130/G22486.1. ISSN 0091-7613.
- Cannat, Mathilde; Mevel, Catherine; Maia, Marcia; Deplus, Christine; Durand, Cecile; Gente, Pascal; Agrinier, Pierre; Belarouchi, Abdel; Dubuisson, Gilles; Humler, Eric; Reynolds, Jennifer (1995-01-01). "Thin crust, ultramafic exposures, and rugged faulting patterns at the Mid-Atlantic Ridge (22°–24°N)". Geology. 23 (1): 49–52. Bibcode:1995Geo....23...49C. doi:10.1130/0091-7613(1995)023<0049:TCUEAR>2.3.CO;2. ISSN 0091-7613.
- Cannat, Mathilde (1993). "Emplacement of mantle rocks in the seafloor at mid-ocean ridges". Journal of Geophysical Research: Solid Earth. 98 (B3): 4163–4172. Bibcode:1993JGR....98.4163C. doi:10.1029/92JB02221. ISSN 2156-2202.

== Awards and honors ==
- Silver Medal, French National Centre for Scientific Research (Médaille d'Argent du CNRS) (2009)
- Fellow, American Geophysical Union (2014)
- Stephan Mueller Medal, European Geosciences Union (2020)
- Murchison Medal, Geological Society of London (2023)
