= Michael Paul Searle =

British geologist

- Education: University College Wales, Aberystwyth (B.Sc.) 1975; Open University (PhD) 1980
- Known for: Geological studies of mountain belts
- Awards: Murchison Medal (2008); Arthur Holmes Medal (2026)
- Scientific career
- Workplaces: University of Newfoundland; University of Leicester; University of Oxford
- Thesis: The metamorphic sheet and underlying volcanic rocks beneath the Semail Ophiolite in the northern Oman Mountains of Arabia (1980)
- Doctoral advisor: Ian Gass

Michael (Mike) Paul Searle is a British geologist best known for his studies of the large-scale structure of mountain belts, including the Himalaya and Karakoram mountains. Searle was awarded the Murchison Medal of the Geological Society of London in 2008, and the Arthur Holmes Medal of the European Geosciences Union in 2026.

== Education and career ==
Searle studied geology at Aberystwyth University, graduating in 1975. He then undertook a Ph.D. at the Open University, working on the Samail Ophiolite in Oman, under the supervision of Ian Gass. After completing his doctoral thesis in 1980, Searle undertook research at the University of Newfoundland, University of Leicester, and University of Oxford. He was elected a fellow of Worcester College, Oxford in 1996.

Over the course of his career, Searle has carried out geological field studies in many parts of the world, including Scotland, parts of the Arabian peninsula, and south-east Asia. In the course of his work he has written several books and made appearances in a number of documentary film series, including "How the Earth Was Made" (2010) and "World's Greatest Mountains" (2018).

== Climbing career ==
Searle is an experienced climber, and he participated in a number of expeditions in the 1970s and 1980s. He visited the Kulu Himalaya in 1978, and led the British Langtang expedition in 1980 and the British Hispar Karakoram expedition in 1989.

== Awards ==
- Arthur Holmes Medal (2026).
- Murchison Medal (2008)
- Foreign Fellow of the Pakistan Academy of Sciences (2014)
- Member, Academia Europea (2019)

== Books and maps ==
- Searle, Mike, Geology and Tectonics of the Karakoram Mountains, 1991
- Searle, Mike. 2013, 2017. Colliding Continents: A geological exploration of the Himalaya, Karakoram, and Tibet.
- Searle, Mike. 2019. Geology of the Oman Mountains, Eastern Arabia.
