= Gabi Laske =

Geophysicist

Gabi Laske is a geophysicist at the University of California, San Diego who is known for her work on the interior of the Earth. Laske was elected a fellow of the American Geophysical Union in 2022.

== Education and career ==
Laske grew up in Germany and earned two degrees from the Universitat Karlsruhe, one in 1988 and a second in 1992. She moved to the University of California, San Diego in 1994, where she started as a postdoctoral scholar. In 2012 she was promoted to professor.

== Research ==
Laske is known for her work on the Earth's interior which she investigates using seismic tomography. Her early research worked on tools to improve the mapping of the subsurface. Her research has also examined the rotation of Earth's innner core, and plumes within the mantle. Laske also examines the movements of earthquakes through the Earth's interior, and a portion of this work was conducted in the vicinity of the Hawaiian islands.

== Awards and honors ==
Laske was elected a fellow of the American Geophysical Union in 2022.

== Selected publications ==
- Laske, G.; Masters, G. (10 July 1996). "Constraints on global phase velocity maps from long-period polarization data". Journal of Geophysical Research: Solid Earth. 101 (B7): 16059–16075. Bibcode:1996JGR...10116059L. doi:10.1029/96JB00526.
- Mooney, Walter D.; Laske, Gabi; Masters, T. Guy (10 January 1998). "CRUST 5.1: A global crustal model at 5° × 5°". Journal of Geophysical Research: Solid Earth. 103 (B1): 727–747. Bibcode:1998JGR...103..727M. doi:10.1029/97JB02122.
- Laske, Gabi; Masters, Guy (November 1999). "Limits on differential rotation of the inner core from an analysis of the Earth's free oscillations". Nature. 402 (6757): 66–69. Bibcode:1999Natur.402...66L. doi:10.1038/47011.
- Masters, Guy; Laske, Gabi; Bolton, Harold; Dziewonski, Adam (2000). "The relative behavior of shear velocity, bulk sound speed, and compressional velocity in the mantle: Implications for chemical and thermal structure". Earth's Deep Interior: Mineral Physics and Tomography from the Atomic to the Global Scale. Geophysical Monograph Series. Vol. 117. pp. 63–87. doi:10.1029/gm117p0063. ISBN 978-0-87590-975-2.
- Wolfe, Cecily J.; Solomon, Sean C.; Laske, Gabi; Collins, John A.; Detrick, Robert S.; Orcutt, John A.; Bercovici, David; Hauri, Erik H. (4 December 2009). "Mantle Shear-Wave Velocity Structure Beneath the Hawaiian Hot Spot". Science. 326 (5958): 1388–1390. Bibcode:2009Sci...326.1388W. doi:10.1126/science.1180165. PMID 19965755.
