= John Frederick Dewey =

British structural geologist

John Dewey
- Born: John Frederick Dewey; 22 May 1937; London, England
- Education: University of London
- Awards: Wollaston Medal (1999); Penrose Medal (1992); Fellow of the Royal Society (1985)
- Scientific career
- Workplaces: University of Manchester; University of Cambridge; Memorial University of Newfoundland; State University of New York at Albany; University of Durham; University College
- Doctoral students: Celâl Şengör

John Frederick Dewey FRS (born 22 May 1937) is a British structural geologist and a strong proponent of the theory of plate tectonics, building upon the early work undertaken in the 1960s and 1970s. He is widely regarded as an authority on the development and evolution of mountain ranges.

== Biography ==
Dewey was educated at Bancroft's School and Queen Mary and Imperial College at the University of London where he was awarded a BSc and PhD in geology. Following a period as lecturer at the University of Manchester (1960–64), the University of Cambridge (1964–1970) and Memorial University of Newfoundland (1971), Dewey was appointed Professor of Geology at the State University of New York at Albany. During this period he produced a series of classic papers centred on the history of the Appalachians in Newfoundland as well as the Scottish and Irish Caledonides. In later years, his research has concentrated upon producing a model to describe the development and orogenic history of the Himalayan mountain range.

Dewey returned to the UK in 1982 as Professor of Geology at the University of Durham, a position he held for four years. Like an earlier Durham geologist, Lawrence Wager, Dewey was appointed Professor of Geology at the University of Oxford (and Fellow of University College) in 1986, a position he held until his resignation in 2000. Since then he has returned to the US as Professor of Geology at the University of California, Davis, although he maintains a position as Senior Research Fellow at University College, Oxford.

John Dewey was elected a Fellow of the Royal Society of London (FRS) in 1985 and has received numerous medals and awards, notably the Wollaston Medal of the Geological Society of London (that society's highest award) in 1999 and the Penrose Medal of the Geological Society of America (1992). Dewey was elected to the United States National Academy of Sciences in 1997, is a Member of the Royal Irish Academy and is a Corresponding Member of the Australian Academy of Science (2011).

== Selected publications ==
- Bird, J. M.; Dewey, J. F. (1970). "Lithosphere Plate-Continental Margin Tectonics and the Evolution of the Appalachian Orogen". Geological Society of America Bulletin. 81 (4): 1031–60. Bibcode:1970GSAB...81.1031B. doi:10.1130/0016-7606(1970)81[1031:lpmtat]2.0.co;2.
- Dewey, J.F., Bird, J.M. (1970). "Mountain belts and new global tectonics". Journal of Geophysical Research. 75 (14): 2625–2685. Bibcode:1970JGR....75.2625D. doi:10.1029/JB075i014p02625.
- Dewey, J.F., Burke, K. (1973). "Tibetan, Variscan and Precambrian basement reactivation: products of continental collision". Journal of Geology. 81 (6): 683–692. Bibcode:1973JG.....81..683D. doi:10.1086/627920. S2CID 128770759.
- Dewey, J. F. (1975). "Finite plate evolution: some implications for the evolution of rock masses at plate margins". American Journal of Science. 275-A: 260–284.
- Dewey, J. F.; Pitman, W. C.; Ryan, W. B. F.; Bonnin, J. (1975). "Plate Tectonics and the Evolution of the Alpine System: Discussion and Reply". Geological Society of America Bulletin. 86 (5): 719–720. Bibcode:1975GSAB...86..719A. doi:10.1130/0016-7606(1975)86<719:PTATEO>2.0.CO;2.
- Karson, J.; Dewey, J. F. (1978). "Coastal Complex, western Newfoundland: An Early Ordovician oceanic fracture zone". Geological Society of America Bulletin. 89 (7): 1037–1049. Bibcode:1978GSAB...89.1037K. doi:10.1130/0016-7606(1978)89<1037:CCWNAE>2.0.CO;2.
- Dewey, John F.; Kennedy, Michael J.; Kidd, William S.F. (1983). "A geotraverse through the Appalachians of northern Newfoundland" (PDF). In Nicholas Rast; Frances M. Delany (eds.). Profiles of Orogenic Belts. Geodynamics Series. Vol. 10. American Geophysical Union.
- Dewey, J. F.; Shackleton, R. M. (1984). "A model for the evolution of the Grampian tract in the early Caledonides and Appalachians". Nature. 312 (5990): 115–121. Bibcode:1984Natur.312..115D. doi:10.1038/312115a0. S2CID 4246028.
- Dewey, J.F.; Shackleton, Robert M.; Chengfa, Chang; Yiyin, Sun (1988). "The Tectonic Evolution of the Tibetan Plateau". Philosophical Transactions of the Royal Society of London. Series A, Mathematical and Physical Sciences. Philosophical Transactions of the Royal Society, A. 327 (1594): 379–413. Bibcode:1988RSPTA.327..379D. doi:10.1098/rsta.1988.0135. S2CID 122295871.
- Dewey, J. F.; Ryan, P. D.; Andersen, T. B. (1993). "Orogenic uplift and collapse, crustal thickness, fabrics and metamorphic phase changes: the role of eclogites". Geological Society of London, Special Publications. 76 (1): 325–343. Bibcode:1993GSLSP..76..325D. doi:10.1144/GSL.SP.1993.076.01.16. S2CID 55985869.
- Van Staal, C. R.; Dewey, J. F.; MacNiocall, C.; McKerrow, W. S. (1998). "The Cambrian-Silurian tectonic evolution of the northern Appalachian and British Caledonides". Geological Society of London, Special Publications. 143: 199–242.
- Dewey, J. F.; Mange, M. (1999). "Petrography of Ordovician and Silurian sediments in the western Irish Caledonides: tracers of a short-lived Ordovician continent-arc collision orogeny and the evolution of the Laurentian Appalachian-Caledonian margin". Geological Society of London, Special Publications. 164 (1): 55–107. Bibcode:1999GSLSP.164...55D. doi:10.1144/GSL.SP.1999.164.01.05. S2CID 129574741.
- Dewey, J. F. (2002). "Transtension in Arcs and Orogens". International Geology Review. 44 (5): 402–438. Bibcode:2002IGRv...44..402D. doi:10.2747/0020-6814.44.5.402. S2CID 129426691.
- Dewey, J. F. (2005). "Orogeny can be very short". Proceedings of the National Academy of Sciences of the United States of America. 102 (43): 15286–15293. Bibcode:2005PNAS..10215286D. doi:10.1073/pnas.0505516102. PMC 1266104. PMID 16126898.
