= Computational Infrastructure for Geodynamics =

Organization that advances Earth science

Computational Infrastructure for Geodynamics (CIG)
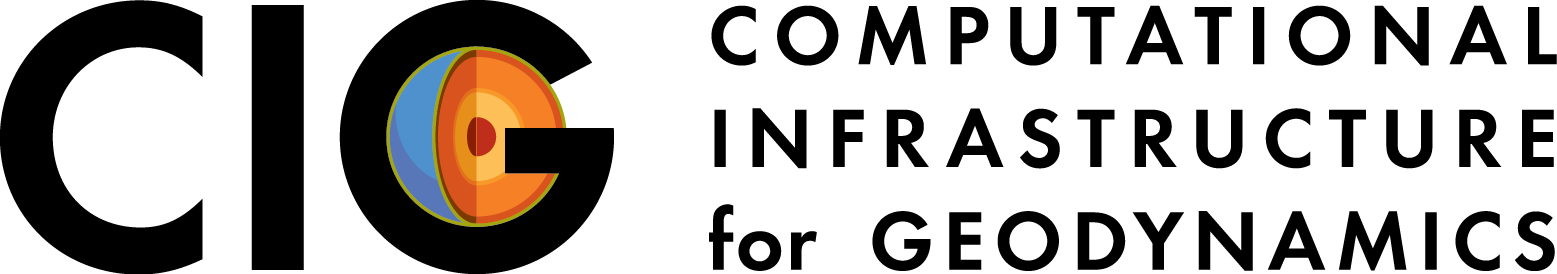
- Founded: 2005
- Purpose: Earth Science, Geodynamics, Geophysics, Open Source Software
- Location: University of California, Davis
- Website: geodynamics.org

The Computational Infrastructure for Geodynamics (CIG) is a community-driven organization that advances Earth science by developing and disseminating software for geophysics and related fields. It is a National Science Foundation-sponsored collaborative effort to improve geodynamic modelling and develop, support, and disseminate open-source software for the geodynamics research and higher education communities.

CIG is located at the University of California, Davis, and is a member-governed consortium with 62 US institutional members and 15 international affiliates.

== History ==
CIG was established in 2005 in response to the need for coordinated development and dissemination of software for geodynamics applications. Founded with an NSF cooperative agreement to Caltech, in 2010, CIG moved to UC Davis under a new cooperative agreement from NSF.

== Software ==
CIG hosts open source software in a wide range of disciplines and topic areas, such as geodynamics, computational science, seismology, mantle convection, long-term tectonics, and short-term crustal dynamics.

== Software Attribution for Geoscience Applications (SAGA) ==
CIG started the SAGA project with an NSF EAGER award from the SBE Office of Multidisciplinary Activities for "Development of Software Citation Methodology for Open Source Computational Science".
