= Geodynamics =

Study of dynamics of the Earth

Geodynamics is a subfield of geophysics dealing with dynamics of the Earth. It applies physics, chemistry and mathematics to the understanding of how mantle convection leads to plate tectonics and geologic phenomena such as seafloor spreading, mountain building, volcanoes, earthquakes, or faulting. It also attempts to probe the internal activity by measuring magnetic fields, gravity, and seismic waves, as well as the mineralogy of rocks and their isotopic composition. Methods of geodynamics are also applied to exploration of other planets.

== Overview ==
Geodynamics is generally concerned with processes that move materials throughout the Earth. In the Earth's interior, movement happens when rocks melt or deform and flow in response to a stress field. This deformation may be brittle, elastic, or plastic, depending on the magnitude of the stress and the material's physical properties, especially the stress relaxation time scale. Rocks are structurally and compositionally heterogeneous and are subjected to variable stresses, so it is common to see different types of deformation in close spatial and temporal proximity. When working with geological timescales and lengths, it is convenient to use the continuous medium approximation and equilibrium stress fields to consider the average response to average stress.

Experts in geodynamics commonly use data from geodetic GPS, InSAR, and seismology, along with numerical models, to study the evolution of the Earth's lithosphere, mantle and core.

Work performed by geodynamicists may include:

- Modeling brittle and ductile deformation of geologic materials
- Predicting patterns of continental accretion and breakup of continents and supercontinents
- Observing surface deformation and relaxation due to ice sheets and post-glacial rebound, and making related conjectures about the viscosity of the mantle
- Finding and understanding the driving mechanisms behind plate tectonics.

== Deformation of rocks ==
Rocks and other geological materials experience strain according to three distinct modes, elastic, plastic, and brittle depending on the properties of the material and the magnitude of the stress field. Stress is defined as the average force per unit area exerted on each part of the rock. Pressure is the part of stress that changes the volume of a solid; shear stress changes the shape. If there is no shear, the fluid is in hydrostatic equilibrium. Since, over long periods, rocks readily deform under pressure, the Earth is in hydrostatic equilibrium to a good approximation. The pressure on rock depends only on the weight of the rock above, and this depends on gravity and the density of the rock. In a body like the Moon, the density is almost constant, so a pressure profile is readily calculated. In the Earth, the compression of rocks with depth is significant, and an equation of state is needed to calculate changes in density of rock even when it is of uniform composition.

=== Elastic ===
Elastic deformation is always reversible, which means that if the stress field associated with elastic deformation is removed, the material will return to its previous state. Materials only behave elastically when the relative arrangement along the axis being considered of material components (e.g. atoms or crystals) remains unchanged. This means that the magnitude of the stress cannot exceed the yield strength of a material, and the time scale of the stress cannot approach the relaxation time of the material. If stress exceeds the yield strength of a material, bonds begin to break (and reform), which can lead to ductile or brittle deformation.

=== Ductile ===
Ductile or plastic deformation happens when the temperature of a system is high enough so that a significant fraction of the material microstates (figure 1) are unbound, which means that a large fraction of the chemical bonds are in the process of being broken and reformed. During ductile deformation, this process of atomic rearrangement redistributes stress and strain towards equilibrium faster than they can accumulate. Examples include bending of the lithosphere under volcanic islands or sedimentary basins, and bending at oceanic trenches. Ductile deformation happens when transport processes such as diffusion and advection that rely on chemical bonds to be broken and reformed redistribute strain about as fast as it accumulates.

=== Brittle ===
When strain localizes faster than these relaxation processes can redistribute it, brittle deformation occurs. The mechanism for brittle deformation involves a positive feedback between the accumulation or propagation of defects especially those produced by strain in areas of high strain, and the localization of strain along these dislocations and fractures. In other words, any fracture, however small, tends to focus strain at its leading edge, which causes the fracture to extend.

In general, the mode of deformation is controlled not only by the amount of stress, but also by the distribution of strain and strain associated features. Whichever mode of deformation ultimately occurs is the result of a competition between processes that tend to localize strain, such as fracture propagation, and relaxational processes, such as annealing, that tend to delocalize strain.

=== Deformation structures ===
Structural geologists study the results of deformation, using observations of rock, especially the mode and geometry of deformation to reconstruct the stress field that affected the rock over time. Structural geology is an important complement to geodynamics because it provides the most direct source of data about the movements of the Earth. Different modes of deformation result in distinct geological structures, e.g. brittle fracture in rocks or ductile folding.

== Thermodynamics ==
The physical characteristics of rocks that control the rate and mode of strain, such as yield strength or viscosity, depend on the thermodynamic state of the rock and composition. The most important thermodynamic variables in this case are temperature and pressure. Both of these increase with depth, so to a first approximation the mode of deformation can be understood in terms of depth. Within the upper lithosphere, brittle deformation is common because under low pressure rocks have relatively low brittle strength, while at the same time low temperature reduces the likelihood of ductile flow. After the brittle-ductile transition zone, ductile deformation becomes dominant. Elastic deformation happens when the time scale of stress is shorter than the relaxation time for the material. Seismic waves are a common example of this type of deformation. At temperatures high enough to melt rocks, the ductile shear strength approaches zero, which is why shear mode elastic deformation (S-Waves) will not propagate through melts.

== Forces ==
The main motive force behind stress in the Earth is provided by thermal energy from radioisotope decay, friction, and residual heat. Cooling at the surface and heat production within the Earth create a metastable thermal gradient from the hot core to the relatively cool lithosphere. This thermal energy is converted into mechanical energy by thermal expansion. Deeper and hotter rocks often have higher thermal expansion and lower density relative to overlying rocks. Conversely, rock that is cooled at the surface can become less buoyant than the rock below it. Eventually this can lead to a Rayleigh-Taylor instability (Figure 2), or interpenetration of rock on different sides of the buoyancy contrast.

Figure 2 shows a Rayleigh-Taylor instability in 2D using the Shan-Chen model. The red fluid is initially located in a layer on top of the blue fluid, and is less buoyant than the blue fluid. After some time, a Rayleigh-Taylor instability occurs, and the red fluid penetrates the blue one.

Negative thermal buoyancy of the oceanic plates is the primary cause of subduction and plate tectonics, while positive thermal buoyancy may lead to mantle plumes, which could explain intraplate volcanism. The relative importance of heat production vs. heat loss for buoyant convection throughout the whole Earth remains uncertain and understanding the details of buoyant convection is a key focus of geodynamics.

== Methods ==
Geodynamics is a broad field which combines observations from many different types of geological study into a broad picture of the dynamics of Earth. Close to the surface of the Earth, data includes field observations, geodesy, radiometric dating, petrology, mineralogy, drilling boreholes and remote sensing techniques. However, beyond a few kilometers depth, most of these kinds of observations become impractical. Geologists studying the geodynamics of the mantle and core must rely entirely on remote sensing, especially seismology, and experimentally recreating the conditions found in the Earth in high pressure high temperature experiments.(see also Adams–Williamson equation).

=== Numerical modeling ===
Because of the complexity of geological systems, computer modeling is used to test theoretical predictions about geodynamics using data from these sources.

There are two main ways of geodynamic numerical modeling.

1. Modelling to reproduce a specific observation: This approach aims to answer what causes a specific state of a particular system.
2. Modelling to produce basic fluid dynamics: This approach aims to answer how a specific system works in general.

Basic fluid dynamics modelling can further be subdivided into instantaneous studies, which aim to reproduce the instantaneous flow in a system due to a given buoyancy distribution, and time-dependent studies, which either aim to reproduce a possible evolution of a given initial condition over time or a statistical (quasi) steady-state of a given system.

== See also ==
- Computational Infrastructure for Geodynamics – Organization that advances Earth science
- Cytherodynamics
