= Marin (name) =

- Gender: Unisex

Other names
- Variant form: Marina
- Nickname: Maro
- Derived: from Marinus

Marin or Marín is a common French, Northern Italian, Venetian or Romanian given name or surname. It is a variant of the Latin name Marinus.

== Given name ==
- Marin Alsop (born 1956), American conductor and violinist, and music director of the Baltimore Symphony Orchestra
- Marin Andrei (1940–2026), Romanian footballer
- Marin Barleti (c. 1450 – c. 1520), Albanian historian and Catholic priest
- Marin Boucher (1587 or 1589–1671), early settler in New France
- Marin Ceaușescu (1916–1989), Romanian economist and diplomat, older brother of President Nicolae Ceauşescu
- Marin Čilić (born 1988), Croatian professional tennis player
- Marin Clark, American earth scientist
- Marin Drăcea (1885–1958), Romanian silviculturist
- Marin Drinov (1838–1906), Bulgarian historian and philologist
- Marin Držić (1508–1567), Croatian Renaissance playwright and prose writer
- Marin Getaldić (1568–1626), mathematician and physicist born in Dubrovnik
- Marin Goleminov (1908–2000), Bulgarian composer, violinist, conductor and pedagogue
- Marin Hamill (born 2001), American freestyle skier
- Marin Hinkle (born 1966), American actress
- Marin Honda (本田 真凜, born 2001), Japanese figure skater
- Marin Ireland (born 1979), American actress
- Marin Kajiki (梶木 真凜, born 1999), Japanese rugby sevens player
- Marin Karmitz (born 1938), French businessman, film producer, director and distributor
- Marin Mägi-Efert (born 1982), Estonian actress
- Marin Marais (1656–1728), French Baroque music composer
- Marin Matsushita (松下 舞琳, born 2006), Japanese women's professional shogi player
- Marin Mazzie (1960–2018), American actress and singer
- Marin Mema (born 1981), Albanian journalist
- Marin Mersenne (1588–1648), French theologian, philosopher, mathematician and music theorist
- Marin Morrison (1990–2009), American Paralympic swimmer
- Marin Preda (1922–1980), Romanian novelist
- Marin Rozić (born 1983), Croatian professional basketball player
- Marin Sais (1890–1971), American film actress
- Marin Soljačić (born 1974), Croatian physicist and electrical engineer
- Marin, alias of Japanese DJ Yoshinori Sunahara (born 1969)
- Marin Sorescu (1936–1996), Romanian poet, playwright, and novelist, and Minister of Culture
- Marin Skender (born 1979), Croatian football goalkeeper
- Marin Tufan (born 1942), Romanian footballer

=== Fictional characters ===
- Marin (Legend of Zelda), a recurring character in the Legend of Zelda series
- Marin Kitagawa, from the manga series My Dress-Up Darling
- Marin Reigan, the main character of the mecha series Baldios

== Surname ==
- Adrián Marín (disambiguation)
- Alexandru Marin (disambiguation)
- André Marin (born 1965), ombudsman of Ontario
- Andreea Marin (born 1974), Romanian television presenter
- Angel Marin (1942–2024), Vice President of Bulgaria
- Biagio Marin (1891–1985), Italian poet
- Carlos Francisco Chang Marín (1922–2012), Panamanian writer and artist
- Carol Marin (born 1948), American television and print journalist
- Charles-Paul Marin de la Malgue (1633–1713), French officer & explorer in Canada
- Cheech Marin (born 1946), American comedian and actor
- Chief Marin (c. 1781 – 1839), Coast Miwok chief
- Constantin Marin (1925–2011), Romanian musician
- Cristina Marin (born 1981), Romanian gymnast
- Diego Marín Aguilera (1757–1799), Spanish inventor who attempted flight
- Edmond Marin La Meslée (1912–1945), French fighter pilot in World War II
- Floralba Uribe Marín (1943–2005), Colombian writer, poet, critic and activist for women's rights
- Florin Marin (1953–2025), Romanian football player and manager
- Francisco A. Marcos-Marín (born 1946), Spanish linguist
- Gabriel Marin (born 1972), Romanian rower
- Gheorghe Gaston Marin (1918–2010), Romanian-Jewish communist politician
- Gilberte Marin-Moskovitz (1937–2019), French politician
- Gladys Marin (1941–2005), Chilean activist and political figure
- Guadalupe Marín (1895–1983), "Lupe Marín", Mexican model and novelist, wife of Diego Rivera
- Homero Marín Arboleda (born 1959), Colombian Roman Catholic bishop
- Ion Marin (born 1960), Romanian-born Austrian conductor
- Jacques Marin (1919–2001), French actor
- Joel Marin (born 1994), Finnish murderer
- John Marin (1870–1953), American painter
- José Marín (disambiguation)
- Joseph Marin de la Malgue (1719–1774), explorer in Canada
- Luciana Marin (born 1988), Romanian handballer
- Luis Muñoz Marín (1898–1980), Puerto Rico poet, journalist and politician
- Mariana Marin (1956–2003), Romanian poet
- Marilena Marin (born 1947), Italian politician
- Marko Marin (professor) (1930–2015), Slovenian theatre director and art historian
- Manuel Marín (1949–2017), Spanish politician
- Michael Marin (1968–2012), American financier
- Michael L. Marin (born 1956), American doctor and vascular surgeon
- Peter Marin (born 1978), Australian session drummer
- Petre Marin (born 1973), Romanian footballer
- Rafael Marin (born 1959), Spanish science fiction novelist and comic book writer
- Răzvan Marin (born 1996), Romanian footballer
- Rosario Marin (born 1958), treasurer of the United States
- Ruth Rivera Marín (1927–1969), Mexican architect
- Sanna Marin (born 1985), Finnish politician and the 46th Prime Minister of Finland
- William Miranda Marín (1940–2010), mayor of Caguas, Puerto Rico

=== Sports ===
- Carolina Marín (born 1993), Spanish badminton player
- Florin Marin (1953–2025), Romanian footballer
- Jack Marin (born 1944), American basketball player
- José Marín (racewalker) (born 1950), Spanish race walker
- Juan Antonio Marín (born 1975), Costa Rican tennis player
- Luca Marin (born 1986), Italian swimmer
- Luis Marín (footballer, born 1974), Costa Rican football (soccer) player
- Luis Marín Sabater (1906–1974), Spanish football (soccer) player
- Marco Marin (born 1963), Italian Olympic fencer
- Marko Marin (born 1989), German football (soccer) player
- Mihail Marin (born 1965), Romanian chess Grandmaster
- Nicolas Marin (born 1980), French football (soccer) player
- Olimpiu Marin (born 1969), Romanian sports shooter
- Oscar Marin (born 1982), American baseball coach
- Petre Marin (born 1973), Romanian football (soccer) player
- Răzvan Marin (born 1996), Romanian footballer
- Vladimir Marín (born 1979), Colombian football (soccer) player

=== Fictional characters ===
- Daley Marin
- Eagle Marin
- Lex Marin
- Hanna Marin

== Other ==
- Marin County, California, United States
- Marin City, California

== See also ==
- Marin (disambiguation)
- Marinescu (surname)
- Marinović
- Mărinești (disambiguation)
- Marinello
- Saint Marinus, the founder of San Marino
