= Arandilla (river) =

River in Spain

Coordinates: 41.6692°N 3.6881°W

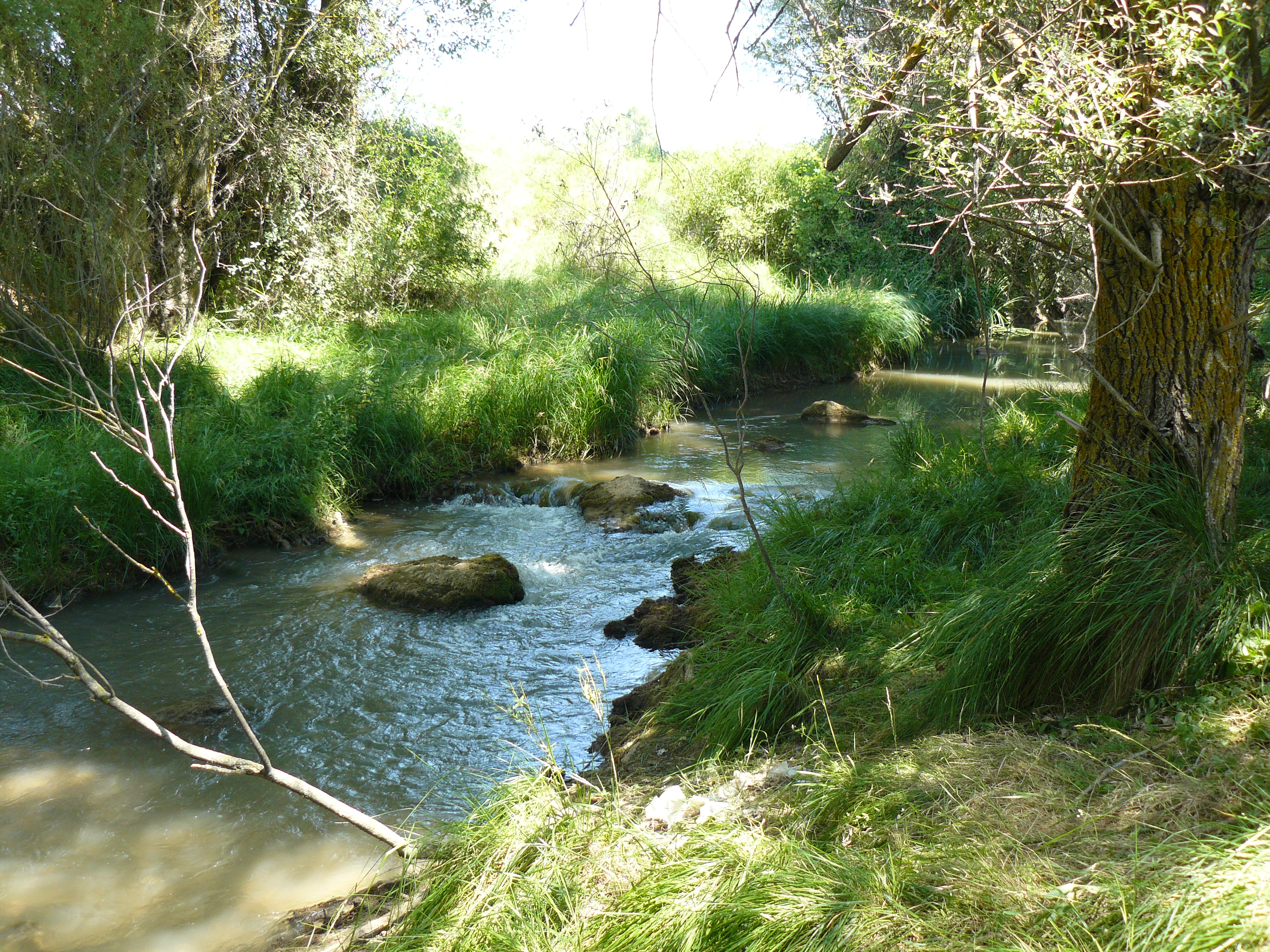
- Watershed of the Arandilla between the towns of Arandilla and Peñaranda de Duero

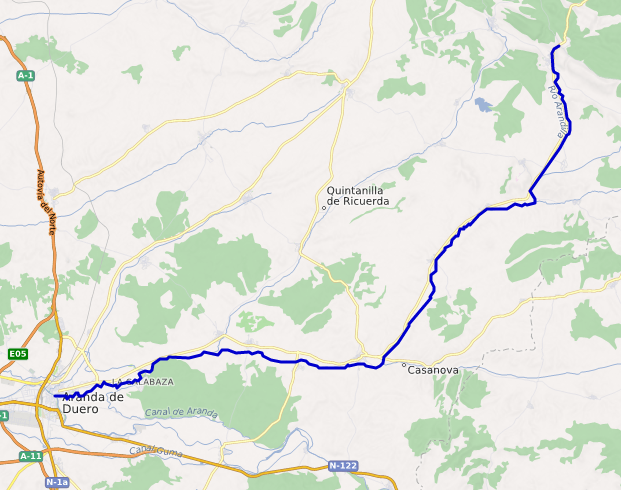

Location
- Country: Spain

Physical characteristics
- Source
  - location: Huerta de Rey, Burgos, Castile and León, Spain
- Mouth: Duero river
  - location: Aranda de Duero, Ribera del Duero, Burgos, Castile and León, Spain
  - elevation: 802 m (2,631 ft)
- Length: 51 km (32 mi)
- Discharge
  - location: Aranda de Duero

Basin features
- Tributaries
  - left: Dor, Espeja, Pilde
  - right: Hozarroyo, Aranzuelo

The Arandilla is a river found in the southeast of Burgos province, Spain. It runs through the following municipalities:

- Arandilla
- Baños de Valdearados
- Brazacorta
- Coruña del Conde
- Fresnillo de las Dueñas
- Hontoria de Valdearados
- Peñaranda de Duero
- Quemada
- San Juan del Monte
- Tubilla del Lago
- Vadocondes
- La Vid y Barrios
- Zazuar
