= Olimpiu =

Olimpiu is a masculine Romanian given name. Notable people with the name include:

- Olimpiu Becheș (born 1955), Romanian rugby union player
- Olimpiu Bucur (born 1989), Romanian footballer
- Olimpiu Blaj (born 1986), Romanian actor
- Olimpiu Marin (born 1969), Romanian sports shooter
- Olimpiu Moruțan (born 1999), Romanian footballer
- Olimpiu G. Urcan (born 1977), chess historian
