= Marin =

Marin or Marín (Italian "sailor") may refer to:

== People ==
- Marin (name), including a list of persons with the given name or Italian surname.
- MaRin, in-game name of professional South Korean League of Legends player Jang Gyeong-hwan (born 1991).
- Chief Marin, of a tribe in California

== Places ==
=== U.S. ===
- Marin City, California
- Marin County, California
- Marin Creek, California
- Marin Headlands, California
- Marin Hills, in southern Marin County, California
- Marin Islands, California
- Marin, California, former name of Point Reyes Station, California

=== Elsewhere ===
- Marin River, a river in Venice, Italy.
- Le Marin, a commune in the French overseas department of Martinique
- Marin, Haute-Savoie, a commune in France
- Marin, Iran, a village in Kohgiluyeh and Boyer-Ahmad Province, Iran
- Marín, Nuevo León, a town and municipality in Mexico
- Marín, Pontevedra, a municipality in Galicia, Spain
- Marin, a village in Crasna Commune, Sălaj County, Romania
- Marin Rural Municipality, a municipality in Bagmati Province, Nepal

== Other uses ==
- Marin (wind), a type of wind in France
- Marin Bikes, bicycle manufacturer based in California
- Marin Boulevard, Hudson County, New Jersey
- Maritime Research Institute Netherlands, an oceanographic institute
- College of Marin, a community college in Marin County, California
- 2K Marin, American and Australian video game developer
- "Marin", French language version title of the song "Sailor"

== See also ==
- Marina
- Marine (disambiguation)
- Marini, a surname
- Marino (disambiguation)
- Marrin (disambiguation)
- Marins
- Saint Marinus (died 366), founder of San Marino
