= Megarex =

- Origin: São Paulo, Brazil
- Genres: Rock and roll, Brazilian rhythms
- Years active: 2000-present
- Members: Flavio de Marchesin; Marco Camarano; Paulinho Barizon
- Website: megarex.com.br

Megarex is a Brazilian rock group formed by Flavio Marchesin, also known as Conde Flávio de Marchesã, (vocals, bass and keyboards), Marco Camarano (guitar) and Paulinho Barizon (drums). The group was composed in São Paulo in the 2000s and it presents a fusion of rock and roll and Brazilian rhythms. It also uses to add to its songs classical instruments, such as violin, creating a kind of alternative rock. The band also uses to compose humoristic lyrics. All these mixes contributes for the group becomes famous as creator of a new style of music.

== History ==
Megarex was formed around 2000 in São Paulo, Brazil. Along its career, the group had many lineups. The actual formation of the group was defined in 2003, in Prêmio Visa de Compositores.

The group has participated of some Brazilian festivals, such as Prêmio VISA de Compositores and TV Cultura Festival. After the show at the former event, in 2003, the band signed a contract with Frontline Records and was positively criticised around the world. Despite this, Megarex recorded the first album independently and put it for free download on its official website.

In 2008, the band played at Musical Villa-Lobos with other artists from São Paulo, Brazil. This event was organized by Flavio Marchesin, vocalist of the band, and aims to presents to the public new artists from that city. In 2009, the band was the third place at British Music Week, released in London, and was voted by the public as the best band of day in Garagem do Faustão, a contest organized by Fausto Silva, on TV Globo, for revealing independent artists.

Megarex has been known by the people for recording a song in portuñol, an unsystematic mix of Portuguese and Spanish languages. The song "El fuca vermejo no mi atropellará jamás" was widespread on YouTube and the band became known through web.

The band recorded only one album until 2009, called Megarex. It took some years for this work get finished because the band change its musicians several times. Actually, the band is developing a project for recording a second album. The group members also have plans for recording an album in English and try to spread their music abroad.

== Discography ==
- 2004: Megarex
