= Diego Marín Aguilera =

Spanish aviation pioneer (1757–1799)

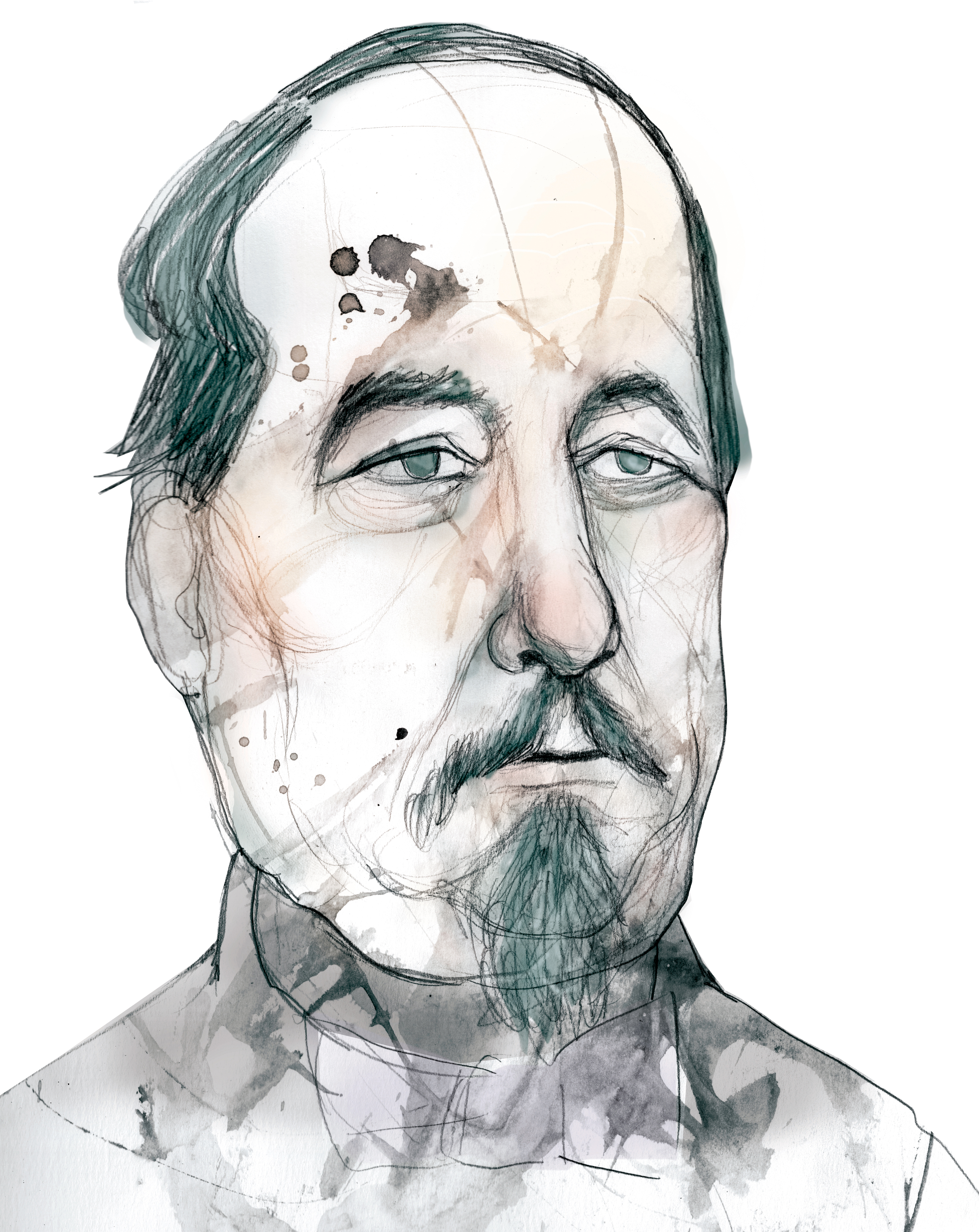
Portrait of Diego Marín by Eulogia Merle

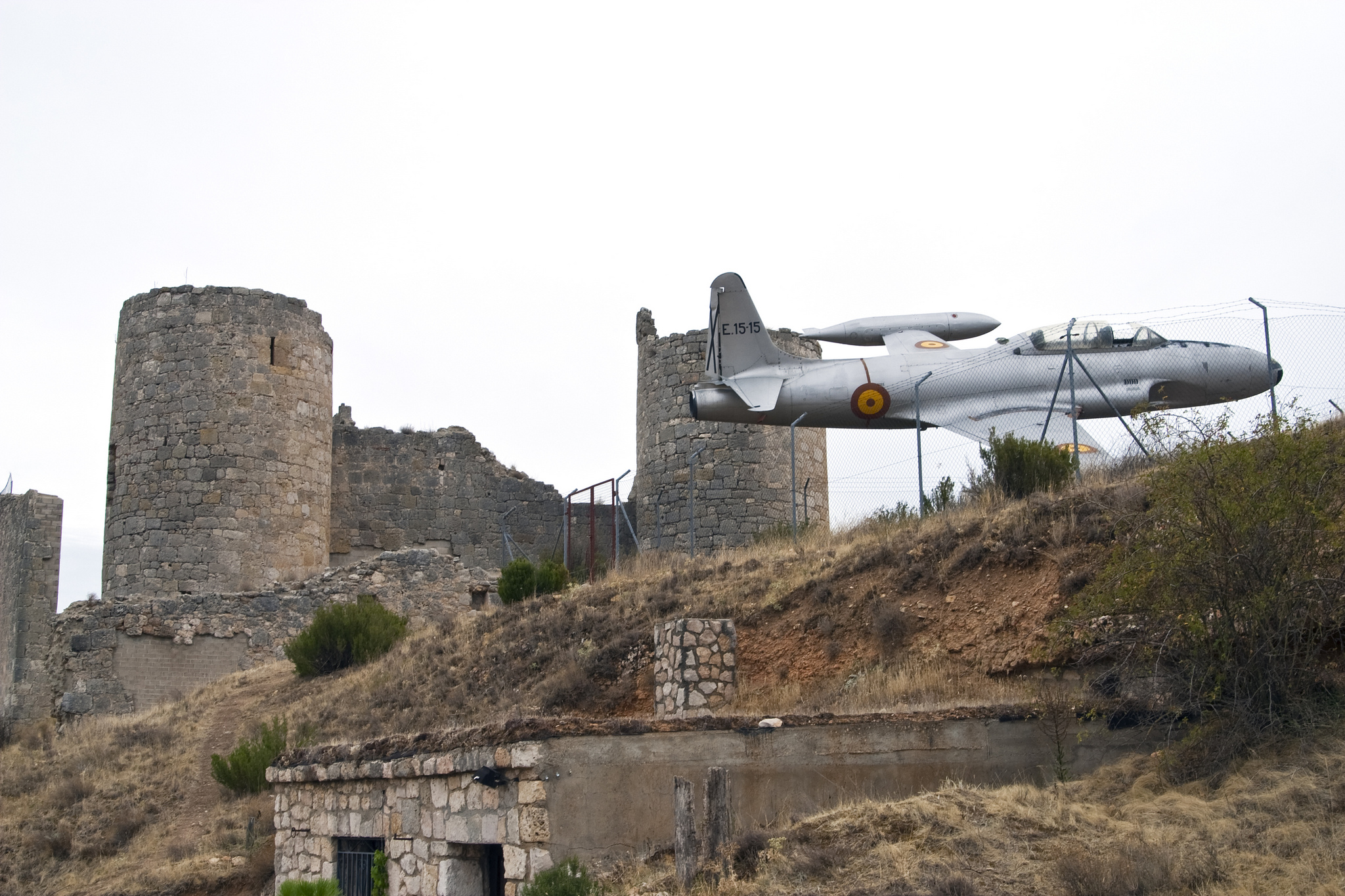
Coruña del Conde castle and plane commemorating aviation pioneer Diego Marín Aguilera

Diego Marín Aguilera (1757–1799) was a Spanish inventor who was an early aviation pioneer.

== Early life ==
Born in Coruña del Conde, Marín became the head of his household after his father died and had to take care of his seven siblings. He worked as an agricultural laborer, tending his animals and fields. Marín spent long afternoons and days herding sheep in the surrounding fields.

== Inventions ==
Early on, Marin devised several labor-saving devices, including a device that improved the functionality of a watermill on the Arandilla river; one that improved the working of a fulling mill; and another used to improve the cutting of marble in the quarries of Espejón. He also came up with a device used to whip horses during the process of threshing, and another that made cloth pads.

== Flying machine ==
Marín was inspired by the eagles he spotted while tending his animals and fields: he wanted to build a flying machine. For six years, he worked on one he invented. The machine was built out of wood, iron, cloth, and feathers. He gathered eagle and vulture feathers by setting up special traps on which he placed rotting meat to attract these birds.

Marín made calculations regarding the weight, volume, size, dimensions of the feathers, as well as the weight of the bodies of these birds. He also carefully studied the movement of their wings and tail and, with the assistance of the local blacksmith, Joaquín Barbero, constructed a pair of wrought iron "joints" that moved about like a fan. He also built stirrups for his feet and hand-cranks that controlled the direction of the flying machine.

=== Attempted flight ===
On the night of 15 May 1793, accompanied by the blacksmith Barbero and one of Marín's sisters, Marín placed his glider on the highest part of the castle of Coruña del Conde. In the light of the full moon, he remarked (roughly): "I'm going to Burgo de Osma, and from there to Soria, and I'll be back in a couple of days."

Flapping the wings of the glider, he reached a height of "six or seven varas" (approximately 5 or 6 m) and according to his companions, glided for "431 Castilian varas", or approximately 300 to 400 metres. The American Institute of Aeronautics and Astronautics writes that he flew for “about 360 meters.” Marín managed to cross the river Arandilla and reached the area known as Heras, where he crash-landed after one of the metal joints broke. Fearing the worst, his companions ran to the spot. Marín was only scratched and bruised, but angry at the blacksmith for failing to weld the joint properly.

== Death and legacy ==
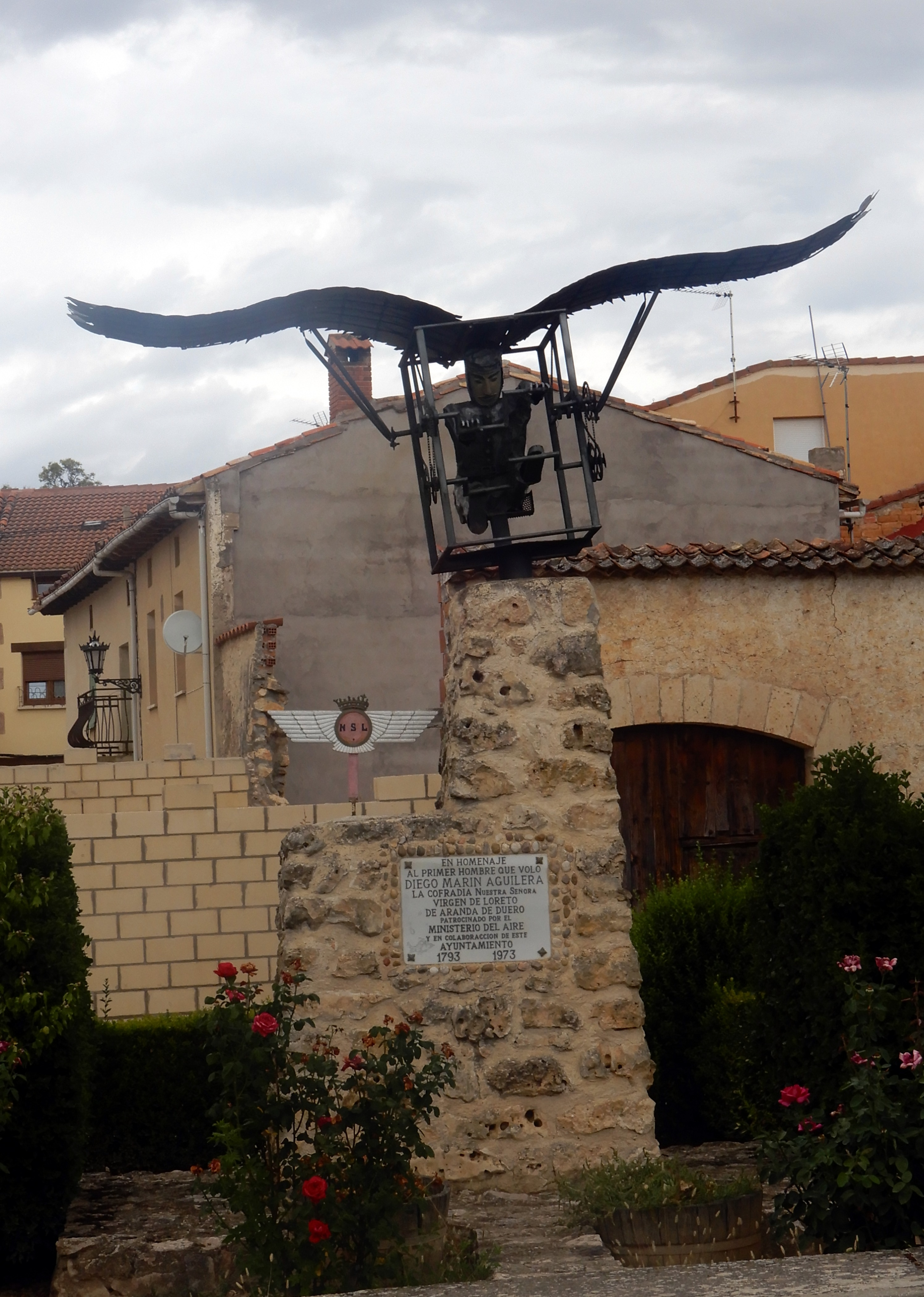
Memorial to Diego Marín Aguilera and a replica of his flying machine

Marín suffered further bad luck. The inhabitants of the town, believing him to be a lunatic, heretic, or a fraud, burned his "demonic" flapping-wing creation. Marín lost all hope and, feeling disgraced and deeply depressed, never attempted flight again. He died at the age of 44 in his native town, six years after his attempted flight. Marín left no documentation regarding his inventions and he was buried at the local church.

Now called the “father of aviation” in Spain, the Spanish Air Force dedicated a monument to him that is located next to the castle where he took flight. The castle was offered for sale for €1 in 2002, on the condition that the buyer restore the crumbling building.

Of Marín, the American Institute of Aeronautics and Astronautics writes: "It is impossible to determine how much truth there is to the story of Marín, but it seems that he did achieve some gliding flight, surviving after structural failure and a crash landing. Marín, who had no formal scientific education, was endowed with a special technical ingenuity and is a good example of the ageless human aspiration toward flight." They credit him with a flight of approximately 360 meters.
