= Megarex (album) =

Studio album by Megarex
- Released: 2004
- Genre: Rock and roll
- Length: 46:11
- Producer: Megarex

Megarex is the first album recorded by the Brazilian rock group Megarex. It was produced by the own band and released in 2004. This album includes the hits "Santo.com" and "El fuca vermejo no mi atropellará jamás", this last one recorded in portuñol.

== Track listing ==
#	Title	Songwriters	Length
1.	"Misturada"	Flavio Marchesin, Eduardo Tibira	3:33
2.	"Bar do Zé Loco"	Flavio Marchesin, Eduardo Tibira	3:53
3.	"El fuca vermejo no mi atropellará jamás"	Flavio Marchesin, Eduardo Tibira, Anthony D'amasco	3:34
4.	"Santo.com"	Flavio Marchesin, Eduardo Tibira	3:32
5.	"Homem stress"	Flavio Marchesin, Eduardo Tibira	4:05
6.	"Pelo ladrão"	Flavio Marchesin	3:24
7.	"The repente"	Flavio Marchesin, Eduardo Tibira	3:35
8.	"Promessa"	Flavio Marchesin	5:22
9.	"João, o pescador"	Les Claypool, Larry LaLonde, Tim Alexander / Portuguese version: Flavio Marchesin, Eliana Rozenkwit	3:45
10.	"O texugo Venâncio"	Flavio Marchesin	4:02
11.	"Negro"	Flavio Marchesin, Eduardo Tibira	3:27
12.	"Homem stress" (versão 2)	Flavio Marchesin, Eduardo Tibira	3:53

== Personnel ==
- Flavio Marchesin: vocals, bass, keyboards, banjo
- Eduardo Tibira: electric guitar, acoustic guitar
- Marco Camarano: electric guitar, acoustic guitar
- Luiz Galdino: violin
- André Novais: drums

Special guests

- Albino Infantozzih: drums (in "Misturada", "Santo.com", "The repente", "O texugo Venâncio", "Negro")
- Anthony D'amasco: drums (in "Bar do Zé Loco", "El fuca vermejo no mi atropellará jamás", "Pelo ladrão", "João, o pescador", "Homem stress (versão 2)")
- Rodrigo Thurler: drums (in "Homem stress")
- Frederico Panzio: percussion (in "Santo.com")
- Cristina Alemann: vocals (in "Santo.com")
- Ângelo Vizarro Jr.: rap (in "Misturada")
