= Rien =

Rien may refer to:

== Given name ==
The Dutch given name is usually a short form of Marinus/Rinus

- Rien van IJzendoorn (born 1952), Dutch professor of child and family studies
- Rien Kaashoek (1937–2024), Dutch mathematician
- Rien Long (born 1983), American college football player
- Rien Morris, Marshallese government minister
- Rien Poortvliet (1932–1985), Dutch draughtsman and painter
- Rien van der Velde (born 1957), Dutch politician

== Places ==
- Rien, Netherlands, a village in the province of Friesland, Netherlands
- Rien (Norway), a lake in Norway

== Music albums ==
Named after the French word for "nothing":

- Rien (Faust album), 1994
- Rien (Noël Akchoté album), 2000
