= Marijn =

Marijn is a Dutch unisex given name derived from Marinus. Marijne is a feminine variant. Notable people with this name include:

Masculine name

- Marijn Backer (born 1956), Dutch columnist and writer
- Marijn Beuker (born 1984), Dutch football manager
- Marijn van den Berg (born 1999), Dutch road bicycle racer
- Marijn Campbell (1819–1890), Dutch librarian and museum curator
- Marijn Dekkers (born 1957), Dutch-American manager and chemist
- Marijn Franx (born 1960), Dutch astronomer
- Marijn Heule, American computer scientist
- Marijn de Kler (born 1994), Dutch football player
- Marijn Lybaert, Belgian player of Magic: The Gathering
- Marijn Poels (born 1975), Dutch filmmaker
- Marijn van Putten (born 1988), Dutch historical linguist
- Marijn Simons (born 1982), Dutch composer, violinist and conductor
- Marijn Sterk (born 1987), Dutch football player
- Marijn Ververs (born 1998), Dutch basketball player

Feminine name

- Marijn van Dijk (born 1972), Dutch linguist
- Marijn Kieft (born 2006), Dutch pole vaulter and multi-event athlete
- Marijn Nijman (born 1985), Dutch cricketer
- Marijn Veen (born 1996), Dutch field hockey player
- Marijn de Vries (born 1978), Dutch road bicycle racer
- Marijne van der Vlugt (born 1965), Dutch musician, model and VJ
