= Marin Clark =

American earth scientist

Marin Kristen Clark
- Education: Massachusetts Institute of Technology
- Scientific career
- Workplaces: University of Michigan
- Thesis: Late Cenozoic uplift of southeastern Tibet (2003)

Marin Kristen Clark is an American earth scientist who is chair for Earth and Environmental Sciences at the University of Michigan. Her research considers lithospheric deformation. She was awarded the 2003 Geological Society of America Doris M. Curtis Award.

== Early life and education ==
Clark was a graduate student at the Massachusetts Institute of Technology where she studied the uplift of southeastern Tibet. She worked alongside Leigh Royden on lower crustal flows and their role in building the eastern margins of Tibet.

== Research and career ==
Clark studies the topography of Planet Earth and its relation to deformation of the lithosphere. She is particularly interested in the evolution of rivers as these provide information about the deformation-induced vertical movement of the Earth. To study these processes, Clark makes use of topographic measurements such as field geology and geographic information system modelling. Clark has developed (U-Th)/He thermochronology to study minerals. She was awarded the 2003 Geological Society of America Doris M. Curtis Award.

After the April 2015 Nepal earthquake, Clark visited Nepal to monitor the co-seismic landslides. Making use of pre- and post-earthquake satellite imagery, she identified that the landslides were more concentrated in the North of the transition between the Lesser and Greater Himalayas.

== Selected publications ==
- M. K. Clark; L. M. Schoenbohm; L. H. Royden; et al. (17 January 2004). "Surface uplift, tectonics, and erosion of eastern Tibet from large-scale drainage patterns". Tectonics. 23 (1). doi:10.1029/2002tc001402. ISSN 0278-7407. Wikidata Q56096026.
- M.K. Clark; M.A. House; L.H. Royden; K.X Whipple; B.C. Burchfiel; X. Zhang; W. Tang (2005). "Late Cenozoic uplift of southeastern Tibet". Geology. 33 (6): 525. Bibcode:2005Geo....33..525C. doi:10.1130/g21265.1. ISSN 0091-7613. Wikidata Q58457928.
- L. D. Brown; Wenjin Zhao; K. D. Nelson; et al. (1 December 1996). "Bright Spots, Structure, and Magmatism in Southern Tibet from INDEPTH Seismic Reflection Profiling". Science. 274 (5293): 1688–1690. doi:10.1126/science.274.5293.1688. ISSN 0036-8075. PMID 8939852. Wikidata Q71824816.
