= Name of Galicia =

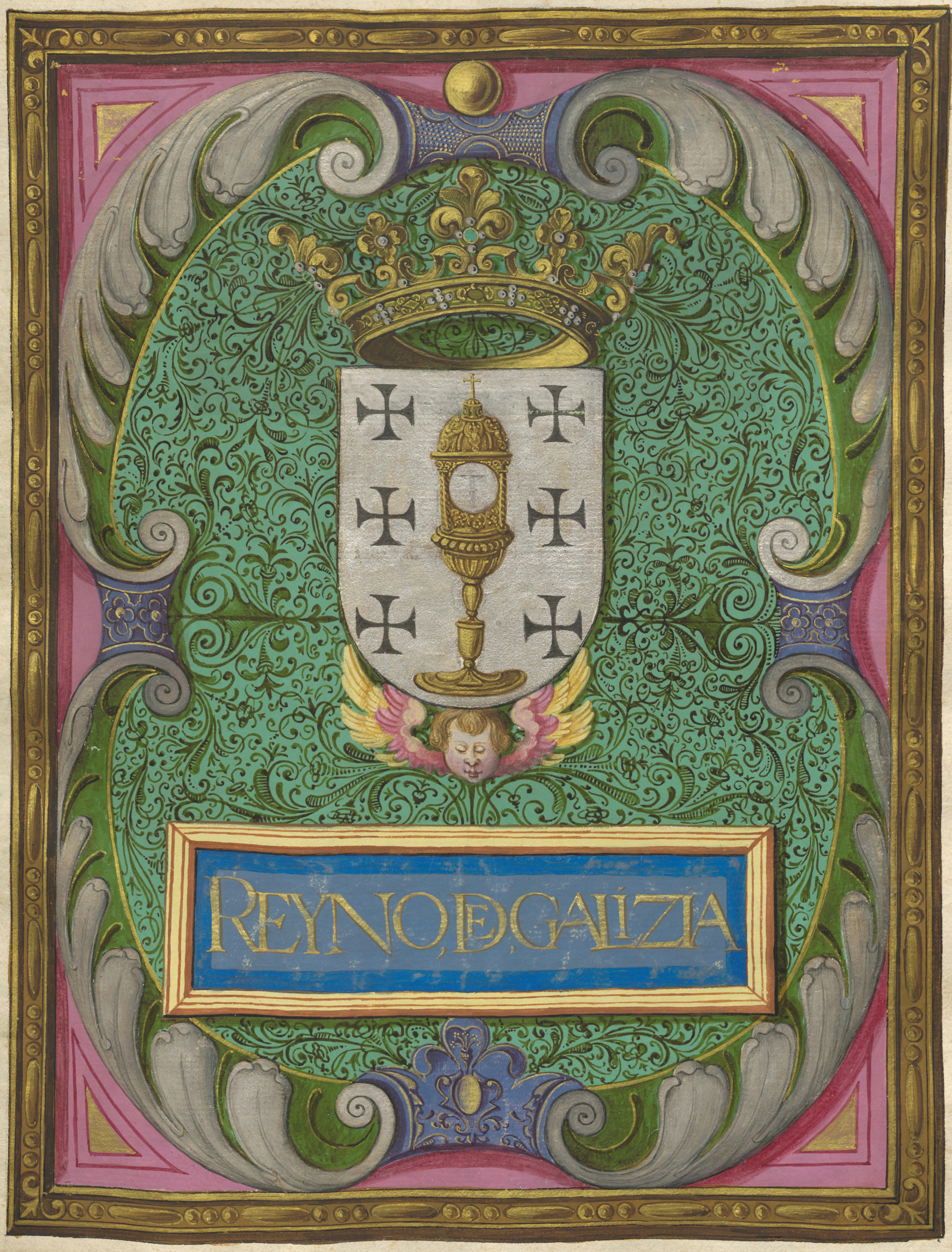
Arms of the Kingdom of Galicia, Pedro de Teixeira, 17th century

The name of Galicia, an autonomous community of Spain and former kingdom on the Iberian Peninsula, derives from the Latin toponym Callaecia, later Gallaecia, related to the name of an ancient tribe that resided north of the Douro river, the Gallaeci or Callaeci in Latin, or Kallaikói (καλλαικoι) in Greek.

== Etymology ==
The etymology of the name has been studied since the 7th century. The earliest known attempt at this was due to Isidore of Seville, who related the name of the Galicians and of the Gauls to the Greek word γάλα, milk, 'they are called Galicians because of their fair skin, as the Gauls. For they are fairer than the rest of the peoples of Spain.' Currently, scholars relate the name of the ancient Callaeci either to the Proto-Indo-European *kal-n-eH_{2} 'hill', derived through a local relational suffix -aik-, so meaning 'the hill (people)'; or either to Proto-Celtic *kallī- 'forest', so meaning 'the forest (people)'.

== History ==
The Callaeci were the first tribe in the area to help the Lusitanians against the invading Romans, and gave their name to the rest of the tribes living north of them, and to their victor, Decimus Junius Brutus Callaicus, who defeated them in 137 BC and was acclaimed in Rome.

From the beginning of the Christian era, after the campaigns of Augustus had brought all of Hispania under Roman control, the lands of Gallaecia—including Galicia and northern Portugal to the Douro river—were organized into two conventi iuridici, Bracarense and Lucense, belonging to the province Tarraconensis. During the last years of the 3rd century during Diocletian's reforms these two convents, together with the Asturicense, and maybe also the Cluniacense, were organized in a single presidential province, Gallaecia, later promoted to consular status in the 4th century, with the city of Bracara Augusta its capital.

In 411 the Suevi, a Germanic people, settled in Gallaecia, establishing a kingdom which maintained its independence till 585, when it was annexed by the Visigoths of Spain. During these two centuries Gallaecia and its evolved form Gallicia became the name associated with the kingdom of the Suevi and with its territory, which included current Galicia, much of northern Portugal as far as Coimbra and Idanha-a-Velha, much of the Spanish provinces of Asturias, León, and Zamora, and parts of Salamanca.

In 666 the southern extreme of the province, beyond the Douro, was formally reincorporated into Lusitania, but the destruction of the Visigothic kingdom in 711 by the Arabs, and the early reconquest of Coimbra by Galician forces in 866 led to the name Gallicia being applied not just to the westernmost areas north of the Douro, but also to much of the north-west of the Iberian peninsula, from the Bay of Biscay to Coimbra, and from the Atlantic Ocean in the west to the Eo, Navia and Cea rivers in the east, including the city of León. So, from that time and to the twelfth century the name Galicia maintained some kind of duality, which is exactly symbolised by the Arab geographers and historians, who gave the name Jillīqīyah (adaptation of Gallaecia) to the Christian kingdom of the northwest and to the lands north and west of the Sistema Central mountains, now known as Kingdom of Asturias and Kingdom of León, whilst the term Ghālīsīyah (adaptation of Galicia) was more usually reserved for Galicia and Portugal, although both terms were used interchangeably. On the other hand, Gallaecia or an evolved form of it was a common name used by other Europeans to refer in general to the Christians of the northwest of Hispania and to their kingdom. But from the 11th-12th century the independence of Portugal in the south, and the prominence of the city of León in the east as capital of the Christians, led to the restriction of the name Galicia to roughly its actual territorial boundaries.

During the 13th century, with the written emergence of the Galician language, Galiza became the most usual written form of the name of the country, being replaced during the 15th and 16th centuries by the current form, Galicia, which coincides with the Castilian Spanish name. The historical denomination Galiza became popular again during the end of the 19th and the first three-quarters of the 20th century, and it is still used with some frequency by among others the Galician reintegrationists. Nevertheless, this alternative is now seldom used by the Xunta de Galicia, the local devolved government. Besides, the Royal Galician Academy, the institution responsible for regulating the Galician language, whilst recognizing it as a legitimate current denomination has stated that the only official name of the country is Galicia.
