= B. Clark Burchfiel =

American geologist (1934–2024)

- Born: Burrell Clark Burchfiel; March 21, 1934; Stockton, California, U.S.
- Died: February 9, 2024 (aged 89)
- Education: Yale University (PhD)
- Occupation: Structural geologist

Burrell Clark Burchfiel (March 21, 1934 – February 9, 2024) was an American structural geologist. Born in Stockton, California, he earned his Ph.D. in 1961 at Yale University. His first academic appointment was to the Geology department at Rice University. He was the Schlumberger Professor Emeritus of Geology at MIT. Research interests: Origin, development, and structural evolution of the continental crust. His later work involved study of the geological history and evolution of the Tibetan Plateau.

Burchfiel joined the MIT faculty in 1976. Over his career he wrote close to 200 papers and mentored more than 50 graduate students.

Burchfiel died on February 9, 2024, at the age of 89.

== Selected publications ==
- B. Clark Burchfiel (1965). "Structural Geology of the Specter Range Quadrangle, Nevada, and its Regional Significance". Geological Society of America Bulletin. 76 (2): 175–192. Bibcode:1965GSAB...76..175B. doi:10.1130/0016-7606(1965)76[175:SGOTSR]2.0.CO;2. ISSN 0016-7606. Wikidata Q94156866.
- B.C. Burchfiel; R.J. Fleck; D.T. Secor; R. R. Vincelette; G.A. Davis (1974). "Geology of the Spring Mountains, Nevada". Geological Society of America Bulletin. 85 (7): 1013–1022. Bibcode:1974GSAB...85.1013B. doi:10.1130/0016-7606(1974)85<1013:GOTSMN>2.0.CO;2. ISSN 0016-7606. Wikidata Q63385625.
- B. C. Burchfiel and G. A. Davis, Nature and controls of Cordilleran orogenesis, western United States: Extensions of an earlier synthesis, American Journal of Science; 1975; v. 275; no. A; p. 363-396
- B.C. Burchfiel, and G.A. Davis, 1981, Mojave Desert and environs, in Ernst, W.G., ed., The geotectonic development of California (Rubey volume 1): Englewood Cliffs, N.J., Prentice-Hall, p. 217-252.
- B. Clark Burchfiel; Brian Wernicke; James H. Willemin; Garry J. Axen; C. Scott Cameron (December 1982). "A new type of decollement thrusting". Nature. 300 (5892): 513–515. Bibcode:1982Natur.300..513B. doi:10.1038/300513A0. ISSN 1476-4687. Wikidata Q70024056. Abstract
- Peter Molnar; B. Clark Burchfiel; Zhao Ziyun; Liang K'uangyi; Wang Shuji; Huang Minmin (1 January 1987). "Geologic Evolution of Northern Tibet: Results of an Expedition to Ulugh Muztagh". Science. 235 (4786): 299–305. Bibcode:1987Sci...235..299M. doi:10.1126/SCIENCE.235.4786.299. ISSN 0036-8075. PMID 17750385. S2CID 26806898. Wikidata Q80933142. Abstract
- B. C. Burchfiel; L. H. Royden (1991). "Antler orogeny: A Mediterranean-type orogeny". Geology. 19 (1): 66–69. Bibcode:1991Geo....19...66B. doi:10.1130/0091-7613(1991)019<0066:AOAMTO>2.3.CO;2. ISSN 0091-7613. Wikidata Q61660578.
- B. C. Burchfiel; Darrel S. Cowan; Gregory A. Davis (1992). "Tectonic overview of the Cordilleran orogen in the western United States". The Cordilleran Orogen: Conterminous U.S.: 407–414. doi:10.1130/DNAG-GNA-G3.407. S2CID 127511612. Wikidata Q96581212.
- B. C. Burchfiel; Radoslav Nakov (April 2015). "The multiply deformed foreland fold-thrust belt of the Balkan orogen, northern Bulgaria". Geosphere. 11 (2): 463–490. Bibcode:2015Geosp..11..463B. doi:10.1130/GES01020.1. ISSN 1553-040X. Wikidata Q98177716.

== Awards and positions held ==
- 1985, elected to National Academy of Sciences
- 1995, Career Achievement Award from the Geological Society of America
- 1998, elected to the Chinese Academy of Sciences
- 2003, elected President of the Geological Society of America
- 2009, Awarded the Penrose Medal; see List of Penrose Medal winners
- 2013, Awarded the Distinguished Service Award, International Division of the Geological Society of America
