= San Juan del Monte =

San Juan del Monte may refer to:

- San Juan, Metro Manila, formerly as San Juan del Monte, a city in the Philippines
  - Battle of San Juan del Monte, 1896
- San Juan del Monte, Province of Burgos, a municipality and town located in Castile and León, Spain
