= Marinus (given name) =

- Gender: Male

Other names
- Variant forms: Marin, Marina

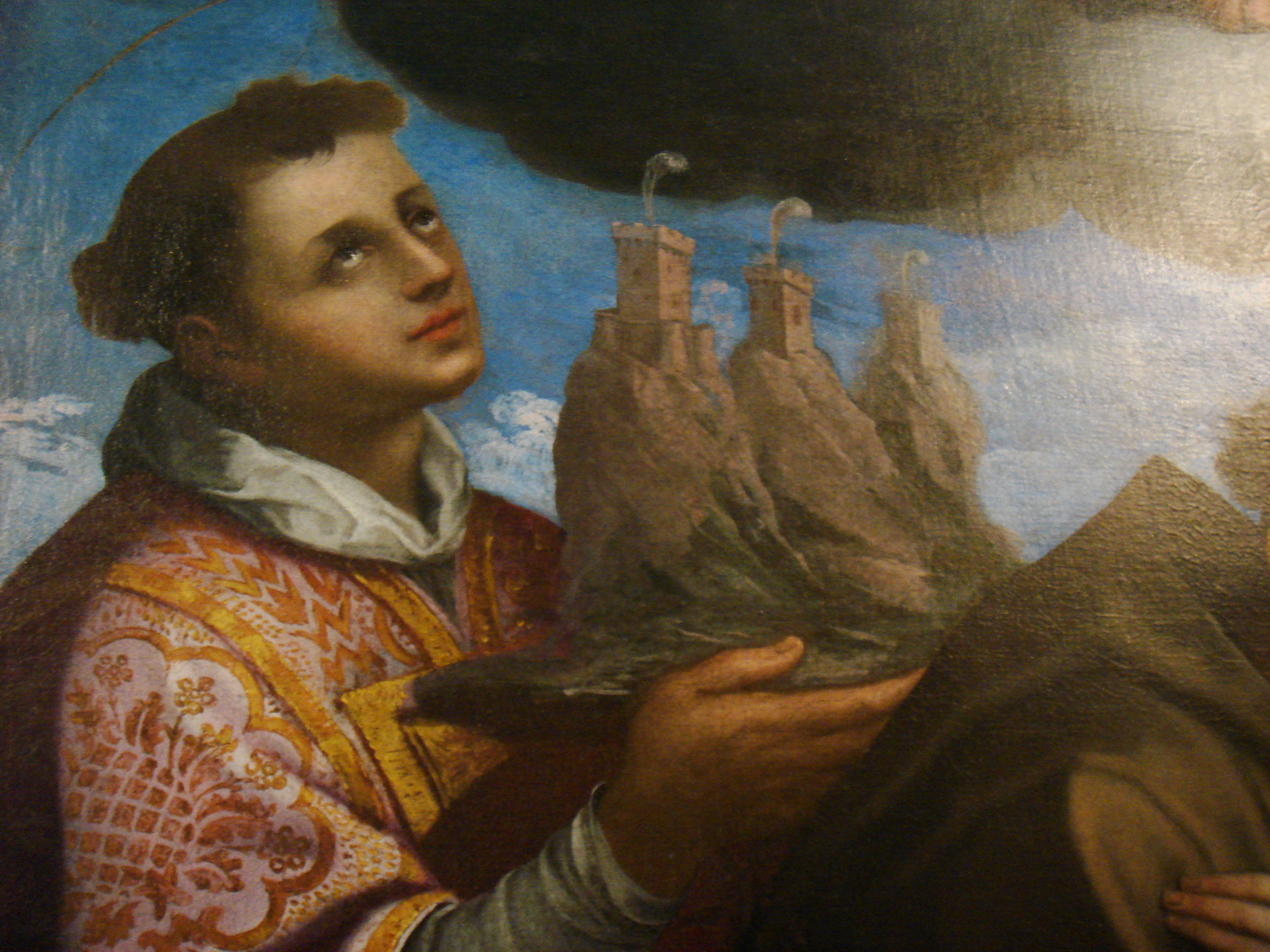
Saint Marinus, 1640 c. On display at the National Museum of San Marino.

Marinus, and its Greek form Marinos (Ancient Greek: Μαρῖνος, Greek: Μαρίνος), is a male name, derived from Latin marinus meaning "marine; of or pertaining to the sea". It is used in the Netherlands as a given name, though most people use a short form in daily life, like Marijn, Mario, René, Rien, Rini, Riny, or Rinus. It may refer to:

== Ancient ==
- Marinus of Tyre (70–130), Hellenized geographer, cartographer and mathematician
- Julius Marinus (fl. 3rd century), father of Phillip the Arab
- Marinus of Caesarea (died 262), Roman soldier and Christian martyr and saint
- Saint Marinus (died 366), founder of San Marino
- Marinus of Thrace (died c.420), Arian Archbishop of Constantinople
- Marinus of Neapolis (born c.440), Neoplatonist philosopher
- Marinus (praetorian prefect) (fl. 498-519), Byzantine official and admiral
- Marinos, monastic name of Marina the Monk (5th century)

== Medieval ==
- Pope Marinus
  - Pope Marinus I (died 884)
  - Pope Marinus II (died 946)
- Marinus, Duke of Gaeta
  - Marinus I of Gaeta (died 866), Italian duke
  - Marinus II of Gaeta (died 984), Italian duke
- Marinus, Duke of Naples
  - Marinus I of Naples (died 928), Italian duke
  - Marinus II of Naples (died 992), Italian duke
- Marinus Sebastus of Amalfi, 11th-century Italian duke

== Latinized names of Renaissance people ==
- Marinus Sanutus the Elder (Marino Sanuto; c. 1260 – 1338), Venetian statesman and geographer
- Marinus Barletius (Marin Barleti; c.1455–1512), Albanian historian
- Marinus Sanutus the Younger (Marino Sanuto; 1466–1536), Venetian historian
- Marinus Ghetaldus (1568–1626), Ragusan mathematician and physicist
- Marinus Bizzius (1570–1624), Venetian patrician in Dalmatia and archbishop

== Academics ==
- Marinus Anton Donk (1908–1972), Dutch mycologist
- Marinus H. "Rien" van IJzendoorn (born 1952), Dutch professor of child and family studies
- Marinus A. "Rien" Kaashoek (born 1937), Dutch mathematician
- Marinus F. "Frans" Kaashoek (born 1965), Dutch computer scientist
- Marinus Vertregt (1897–1973), Dutch astronomer

== Arts ==
- Marinus Andersen 1895–1985), Danish architect
- Marinus F.J. "Marijn" Backer (born 1956), Dutch columnist, teacher, poet and writer
- Marinus Boezem (born 1934), Dutch sculptor and conceptual artist
- Marinus "Rinus" Gerritsen (born 1946), Dutch rock bass guitarist
- Marinus Robyn van der Goes (1599–1639), Flemish engraver
- Marinus Jan Granpré Molière (1883–1972), Dutch architect
- Marinus Heijnes (1888–1963), Dutch impressionist painter
- Marinus de Jong (1891–1984), Dutch-born Belgian composer and pianist
- Marinus Adrianus Koekkoek (1807–1868), Dutch landscape painter
- Marinus Adrianus Koekkoek (II) (1873–1944), Dutch landscape and animal painter
- Marinus Harm "Rien" Poortvliet (1932–1995), Dutch draughtsman and painter
- Marinus van Reymerswaele (c.1490–c.1546), Dutch painter
- Marinus Snoeren (1919–1982), Dutch cellist
- Marinus Vreugde (1880-1957), Dutch sculptor and graphic artist

== Government, military, religion ==
- Marinus Canning (1829–1911), Australian banker and politician
- Marinus van der Goes van Naters (1900–2005), Dutch nobleman and Labour politician
- Marinus Theodoor "Rene" Hidding (born 1953), Dutch-born Australian politician
- Marinus Kok (1916–1982), Dutch Old Catholic archbishop
- Marinus Larsen (1849–?), Danish-born American Mormon leader
- Marinos Mitralexis (1920–1948), Greek pilot
- Marinus W.J.M. "Rinus" Peijnenburg (1928–1979), Dutch politician, minister without portfolio
- Marinus Bernardus Rost van Tonningen (1852–1927), Dutch Army general in the Dutch East Indies
- Marinus Willett (1740–1830), American soldier and political leader

== Sports ==
- Marinus Antonius "Mario Been (born 1963), Dutch football player and manager
- Marinus "Rinus" Bennaars (1931–2021), Dutch footballer
- Marinus "Rinus" van den Berge (1900–1972), Dutch sprinter
- Marinus Bester (born 1969), German footballer
- Marinus Dijkhuizen (born 1972), Dutch football player and manager
- Marinus "Rinus" Israël (born 1942), Dutch footballer
- Marinus Kraus (born 1991), German ski jumper
- Marinus J.H. "Rinus" Michels (1928–2005), Dutch football player and coach, FIFA "Coach of the Century"
- Marinos Ouzounidis (born 1968), Greek football player and manager
- Marinus C. "Rinus" Paul (born 1941), Dutch cyclist
- Marinus A.J. "René" Pijnen (born 1946), Dutch cyclist
- Marinus van Rekum (1884–1955), Dutch tug of war competitor
- Marinus Sørensen (1898–1962), Danish sprinter
- Marinus Govert "Marijn" Sterk (born 1987), Dutch footballer
- Marinus Valentijn (1900–1991), Dutch road bicycle racer
- Marinus "Rini" Wagtmans (born 1946), Dutch road bicycle racer
- Marinus Wanewar (born 1997), Indonesian footballer
- Marinus "Mario" Westbroek (born 1961), Dutch sprinter

== Other ==
- Marinus van Dam (1929–1997), Dutch confectionery maker
- Marinus Damen (1905-1985), Dutch co-founder of the Damen Shipyards Group
- Marinus van der Lubbe (1909–1934), Dutch council communist, accused of setting the Reichstag fire
- Marinus "Rien" den Oudsten (1890–1964), Dutch founder coach building company
- Marinus Post (1902–1944), Dutch World War II Resistance fighter

== See also ==
- Marinus (disambiguation)
- Rinus
