= Marinescu =

Marinescu is a Romanian surname deriving from the given name "Marin". Notable people with the surname include:

- Alexandra Marinescu (born 1982), retired Romanian Olympic gymnast
- Andrei Daniel Marinescu (born 1985), Romanian football player
- Angela Marinescu (1941–2023), Romanian poet
- Bogdan Marinescu (1944–2026), Romanian politician
- Gabriel Marinescu (1886–1940), Romanian general
- George Marinescu (mathematician) (born 1964), Romanian mathematician
- Gheorghe Marinescu (1863–1938), Romanian neurologist
- Ion C. Marinescu (1886–1956), Romanian politician
- Laurențiu Marinescu (born 1984), Romanian football player
- Liviu Marinescu (born 1970), Romanian composer of orchestral and chamber music
- Lucian Marinescu (born 1972), Romanian football player
- Marian-Jean Marinescu (born 1952), Romanian politician
- Medeea Marinescu (born 1974), Romanian film actress
- Mihai Marinescu (born 1989), Romanian racing driver
- Nicolae Marinescu (1906–1977), Romanian Olympic fencer
- Nicolae Marinescu (general) (1884–1963), Romanian general and politician
- Radu Marinescu, Romanian politician
- Șerban Marinescu (born 1956), Romanian director and screenwriter
- Tecla Marinescu (born 1960), Romanian sprint canoer
- Ion Marin Sadoveanu (born Iancu-Leonte Marinescu), novelist and journalist

== See also ==
- Alexander Marinesko (1913–1963), Soviet submarine captain
- Marienescu
- Marcu (name)
- Mărinești (disambiguation)
