= Experimental Study Group =

The Experimental Study Group (ESG) describes itself as a freshman learning community at the Massachusetts Institute of Technology. It was created in 1969 by Professor George Valley to explore alternative teaching and learning methods in a small group setting at MIT. Students in ESG take their courses through a combination of small interactive classes, problem-solving sessions (often run by upperclass TAs), and discussion-oriented seminars.

The program consists of 50 first-year students, 30 upperclass teaching assistants and associate advisors, 10 staff and faculty members, as well as ESG alumni and friends of the community. Most ESG students are first-year students interested in a more pro-active approach to their education, who concentrate on core MIT subjects in biology, chemistry, humanities, mathematics, and physics as an alternative to the large lecture classes taken by other classmates.

Current educational experimentation at ESG includes training students to teach, having freshman develop context-related problem sets, and creating videotapes of ESG students teaching core math and science concepts (ESGx). Each spring, ESG offers a series of half-credit, pass-fail seminars (funded by ESG alumni) on a variety of unique subjects, some of which are developed and taught by MIT upperclassmen. In the spring of 2012, seminars were run on: The Art and Science of Happiness, Polymath: The World in 10 Curves, Beyond a Website, The Chemistry of Sports, Fiber Seminar, and Introduction to Trading.

ESG was awarded the Irwin Sizer Award for the Most Significant Improvement to MIT Education in 1985. Staff members have also won the Sizer award, including Dr. Lee Perlman and Dr. Holly Sweet in 1997 for their work in developing the Sex Roles and Relationships seminar and associated MIT peer training program (GenderWorks) in gender relations, and Dr. Perlman again in 2015 for his teaching.

Past ESG directors include Professor George Valley (1969-1975), Professor Robert Halfman (1975-1985), Professor Kim Vandiver (1985-1989), Professor Vernon Ingram (1989-1999), Professor Emeritus Travis Merritt (1999-2002), and Professor Alexander Slocum, who is also an alumnus of ESG class of 1982 (2002-2013). Professor Leigh Royden has been ESG’s director since 2013.

== Noted alumni ==
Many ESG students have gone on to become celebrated alumni, including: three Rhodes scholars (Toby Ayer ’96, Christopher Douglas ’99, and Susanna Mierau ’00); two Fulbright scholars (Anna Waldman-Brown ’11 and Alicia Goodwin-Singham ’14); one MacArthur fellow (Marin Soljacic ’96); and a Nobel Prize winner for physics (Carl Wieman ’73) and "Danny" Hillis, designer of the Connection Machine, a parallel supercomputer, and co-founder of Thinking Machines Corporation, the company that produced the machine.
