= Shūji Satō (shogi) =

Japanese shogi player (born 1967)

- Native name: 佐藤秀司
- Born: June 8, 1967 (age 58)
- Hometown: Furukawa, Miyagi, Japan

Career
- Achieved professional status: October 1, 1990 (aged 23)
- Badge Number: 196
- Rank: 8-dan
- Teacher: Makoto Nakahara (9-dan)
- Tournaments won: 1
- Meijin class: C2
- Ryūō class: 6
- Notable students: Marin Matsushita

Websites
- JSA profile page

Shūji Satō (佐藤 秀司, Satō Shūji; born June 8, 1967) is a Japanese professional shogi player ranked 8-dan. He is a former executive director of the Japan Shogi Association.

== Shogi professional ==
Satō won the 23rd Shinjin-Ō non-title tournament in 1992 when he defeated apprentice professional 3-dan Eiji Ishitobi 2 games to 0.

Satō became the 59th shogi professional to reach 600 career wins on August 23, 2023.

=== Promotion history ===
Satō's promotion history is as follows:

- 6-kyū: 1980
- 1-dan: 1983
- 4-dan: October 1, 1990
- 5-dan: October 11, 1994
- 6-dan: July 9, 1999
- 7-dan: December 10, 2007
- 8-dan: July 31, 2020

=== Titles and other championships ===
Satō has yet to appear in a major title match, but he has won one non-major title championship.

=== Awards and honors ===
Satō received the Japan Shogi Association's "25 Years Service Award" in 2015 in recognition of being an active professional for twenty-five years, and the "Shogi Honor Award" in 2023 in recognition of winning 600 official games as a professional.

== JSA director ==
Satō is a former member of the Japan Shogi Association's board of directors. He was elected to be an executive director for a two-year term at the association's the 66th General Meeting in June 2015.
