= Marinus =

Marinus may refer to:

- Marinus (crater), a crater on the Moon
- Marinus (given name), for people named Marinus
- Dr. Marinus, a recurring character in the novels of David Mitchell

== See also ==
- The Keys of Marinus, a serial in the Doctor Who TV series
