= Jun-Ichiro Mukai =

Japanese biochemist

- Born: July 30, 1931
- Died: January 5, 1998 (aged 66); Kumamoto, Japan
- Citizenship: Japan
- Education: Kyushu University
- Scientific career
- Fields: biochemistry
- Workplaces: Kyushu University; Medical College of Wisconsin; Rockefeller University

Jun-Ichiro Mukai (September 30, 1931–January 5, 1998) is a Japanese biochemist, emeritus professor at faculty of agriculture, Kyushu University.

== Academic works ==
Mukai won the agricultural chemistry prize (Japan) for A Digestive Endonuclease of Silkworm in 1967. Mukai is a co-author of Fritz Albert Lipmann.

== Life ==
Mukai was born as a son of Sannoju Mukai. After graduating Kumamoto Prefectural Seiseikou High School in Kumamoto, he admitted to Kyushu University. He received an Ph.D. from Kyushu University. After that, he became an assistant professor, then professor of Kyushu University. After retirement of Kyushu University, he was a professor of a junior college in Kumamoto, but died on January 5, 1998.
