= Marin Matsushita =

Japanese shogi player

- Native name: 松下 舞琳
- Born: October 25, 2006 (age 18)
- Hometown: Kumamoto, Japan

Career
- Achieved professional status: August 1, 2022 (aged 15)
- Badge Number: W-81
- Rank: Women's 1-dan
- Teacher: Shūji Satō (8-dan)

Websites
- JSA profile page

Marin Matsumoto (松下 舞琳, Matsumoto Marin; born October 25, 2006) is a Japanese women's professional shogi player ranked 1-dan.

== Early life and becoming a women's professional shogi player ==
Matsushita was born in Kumamoto, Japan on October 25, 2006. She became interested in shogi when she was five years old after finding a shogi set as part of board game collection. Under the guidance of shogi professional Shūji Satō, she entered the Kyushu Branch of the Japan Shogi Association's training group system in 2020. In July 2022 while in her first year as a student at Kumamoto Prefectural Seiseikou High School, she qualified for women's professional status after being promoted to training group B2. She is the first women's professional shogi player to come from Kumamoto Prefecture.

== Women's shogi professional ==
=== Promotion history ===
Matsushita's promotion history is as follows.

- 2-kyū: August 1, 2022
- 1-kyū: October 19, 2022
- 1-dan: April 1, 2023

Note: All ranks are women's professional ranks.
