= Adrián Marín =

Adrián Marín may refer to:

- Adrián Martín (motorcyclist) (born 1992), Spanish Grand Prix motorcycle racer
- Adrián Marín (footballer, born 1994), Mexican footballer
- Adrián Marín (footballer, born 1997), Spanish footballer

== See also ==
- Adrián Martínez (disambiguation)
