= Marrin =

Marrin is a surname. Notable people with the surname include:

- Albert Marrin (born 1936), American historian, professor of history, and author
- Charles C. Marrin (1868 –1950), American lawyer, politician, and judge
- Megan Marrin, American painter
- Peter Marrin (born 1953), Canadian ice hockey player

== See also ==
- Marin (name)
