= Sannoju Mukai =

Japanese biochemist (1898–1963)

Sannoju Mukai (1898 - 1963) was a Japanese biochemist, emeritus professor at faculty of technology, Kumamoto University, and a professor of Keijo University. He is also father of Jun-Ichiro Mukai.

== Academic works ==
Mukai made a contribution in Enzyme Chemistry by "On the activation of castor lipase by acids and the ps curve of its action." According to Chemisches Zentralblatt (1929 Band I, Nr.8, 20 Februar), "The optimum effect of the castor lipase is not only dependent on the pH in the Rk. dependent on Mg. Vf. tried the Mg-Verbb. can be removed by treating with H_{2}S0_{4} (75 ccm 0.0.5-n. H_{2}S0_{4}, 10g castor oil powder, 30 min.), washing out and drying for four days. The optimal working conditions were then found at pH = 5.62. -— In the case of unsuccessful attempts, dio Mg-Verb. with pepsin or trypsin, activation of lipase by pepsin has been observed. (Journ. Soc. chem. Ind., Japan [Suppl.] 31. 185 B. 1928. Kyushu, Imp. Univ.) "

== Life ==
Mukai is originally from Saga prefecture. After graduateing Kyushu University he became an assistant professor of Kyushu University. He was a professor of Keijo University until the end of World War II. After the war he became a professor of Kumamoto University.
