= Marinello =

Marinello is an Italian surname from Marinello on Sicily and from Medieval Latin marinellus ("sailor, mariner").

Notable people with the surname include:

- Beatriz Marinello (born 1964), Chilean-American chess player and chess official
- Kathryn V. Marinello (born 1956), American businesswoman
- Juan Marinello (1898–1977), Cuban communist intellectual and writer
- Peter Marinello (born 1950), Scottish former footballer
- Sandra Marinello (born 1983), German badminton player
- Vince Marinello (1938/39–2020), American sportscaster

== See also ==
- Marin
- Marinello Schools of Beauty
