= Marinovich =

Marinovich is a surname found among the Croatian diaspora, an anglicization of Marinović. Notable people with the name include:

- Greg Marinovich (born 1962), South African photojournalist, film maker and photo editor
- Marv Marinovich (1939–2020), American football player and sports trainer
- Pierre Marinovitch (1898-1919), French flying ace of Serbian and Polish descent
- Todd Marinovich (born 1969), American and Canadian football player
