= Marinović =

Origin
- Language: Serbo-Croatian
- Meaning: son of Marin
- Region of origin: Western Balkans

Other names
- Variant form: see also

Marinović (Serbian Cyrillic: Мариновић) is a Serbo-Croatian surname, a patronymic derived from the given name Marin, and matronymic derived from the given name Marina. Notable people with the name include:

- Dario Marinović (born 1990), Croatian futsal player
- Jovan Marinović (1821–1893), Serbian politician and diplomat
- Pierre Marinovitch (1898–1919), French flying ace of Serbian and Polish descent
- Nikola Marinovic (born 1976), Austrian handball player
- Marko Marinović (born 1983), Serbian professional basketball player
- Miodrag Marinović (born 1967), Chilean politician
- Smiljana Marinović (born 1977), Croatian Olympic and national-record holding breaststroke swimmer
- Stefan Marinovic (born 1991), New Zealand footballer
- Stefan Marinović (16th century), Venetian printer
- Teresa Marinovic (born 1973), member of the Constitutional Convention of Chile
- Vinko Marinović (born 1971), Bosnian football manager and former Serbian international player

== See also ==
- Marinovich
