= Libertad Digital =

Online newspaper edited in Madrid, Spain

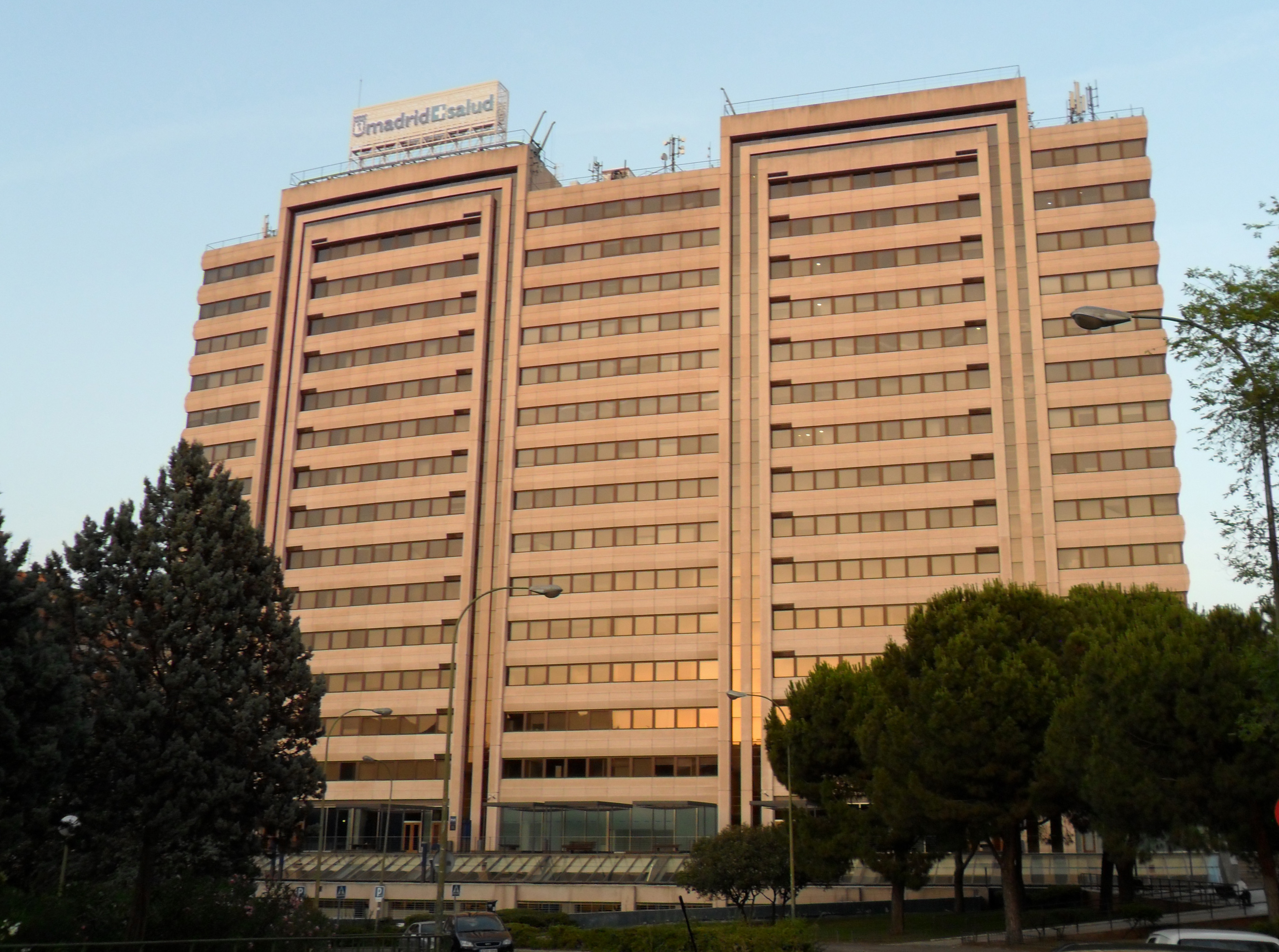
- Type: Digital newspaper
- Owner: Federico Jiménez Losantos
- Editor: Carmelo Jordá; Pilar Díez; Mercedes Rodríguez
- Founded: 8 March 2000; 26 years ago
- Political alignment: Conservatism; Economic liberalism Social conservatism Anti-communism
- Language: Spanish
- Headquarters: Juan Esplandiú, 13. Madrid
- City: Madrid
- Country: Spain
- Website: www.libertaddigital.com

Libertad Digital (LD) is a Spanish-language online newspaper founded on 8 March 2000.

== Origins ==
Libertad Digital was founded by Federico Jiménez Losantos who continues to be associated with the publication. Its first edition was released on 8 March 2000. It was also promoted by the economist Alberto Recarte, who was the first president of the Libertad Digital society, and Javier Rubio, who was its first editor.

In 2004 the media firm decided to seek a capital expansion. Some of the shares were acquired by people connected to the Popular Party such as the party's then treasurer Álvaro Lapuerta. It has been claimed that Recarte persuaded "party circles" to get involved in this project after the party lost the general election of March 2004 to the Spanish Socialist Workers' Party.

Currently, Losantos presides the Libertad Digital society, while the editor of the online newspaper is Raúl Vilas.

== The daily ==
Besides daily news, Libertad Digital is an opinion newspaper. It has nearly a hundred of contributors who write twelve columns a day. Since January 2005, the paper has also had an ideas supplement from Monday to Friday. Among its best-known contributors are Amando de Miguel (es), Carlos Rodríguez Braun, Carlos Semprún, Pío Moa, and Daniel Sirera. In 2004 the editorial Hoja Perenne published the first yearbook.

The paper included the Cox & Forkum editorial cartoons.
