= Marins =

Marins is a surname of Portuguese origin, meaning Marias's son. People with this surname include:

- Alysson Marendaz Marins (born 1976), Brazilian footballer
- Carla Marins (born 1968), Brazilian actress
- Celismar dos Santos Marins (born 1986), Brazilian footballer
- Francisco Marins (1922–2016), Brazilian writer
- José Mojica Marins (1936–2020), Brazilian filmmaker
- Juliana Marins (c. 1998–2025), Brazilian solo traveller and publicist
- Vagner Luís de Oliveira Marins (born 1980), Brazilian footballer

== See also ==
- Marin (disambiguation)
