= Amando de Miguel =

Spanish sociologist (1937–2023)

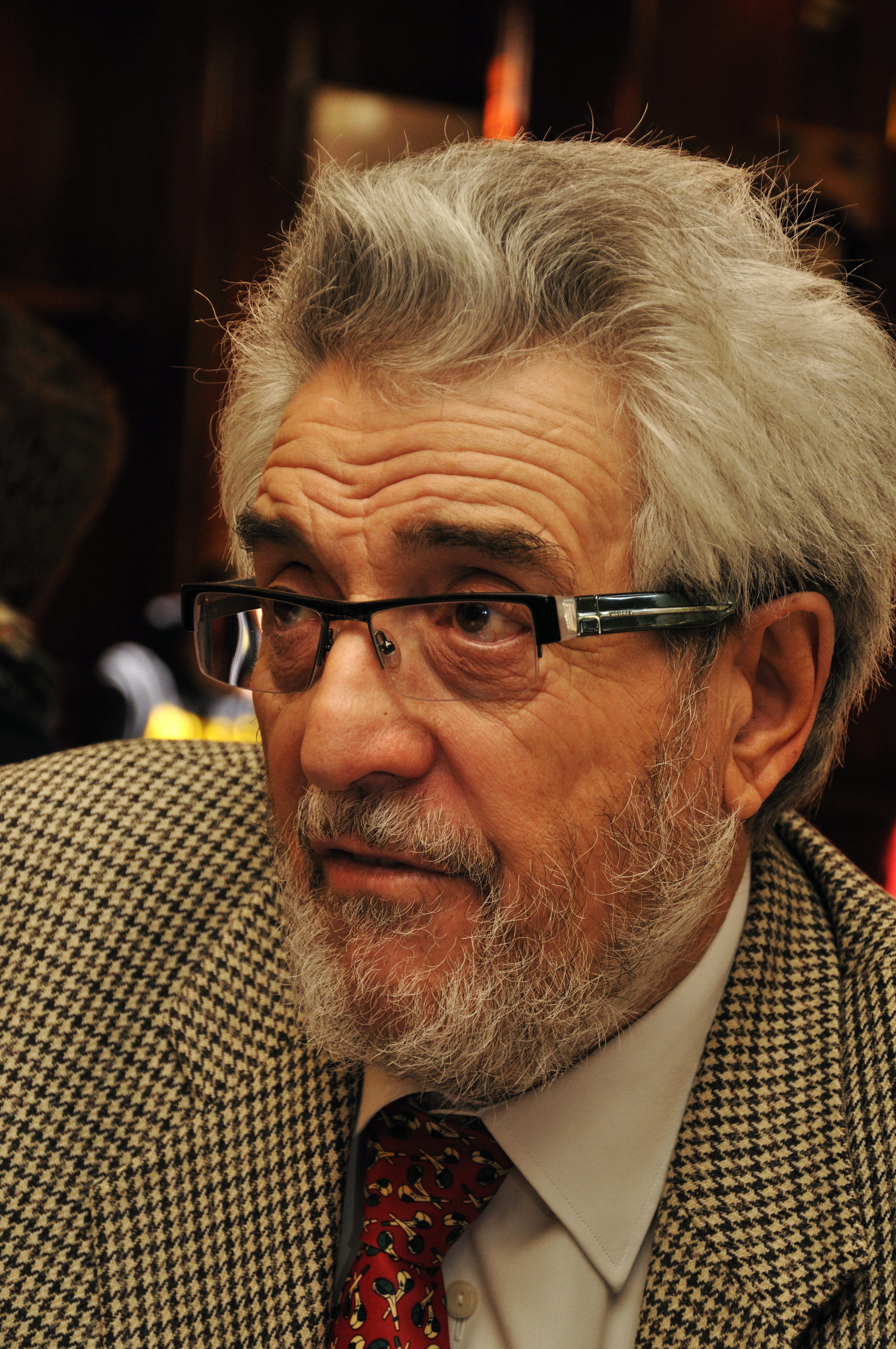
- De Miguel in 2010
- Born: Amando de Miguel Rodríguez; 20 January 1937; Pereruela, Spain
- Died: 3 September 2023 (aged 86); Madrid, Spain
- Education: Complutense University of Madrid
- Occupation: Sociologist

Amando de Miguel Rodríguez (20 January 1937 – 3 September 2023) was a Spanish sociologist.

== Biography ==
Born in Pereruela on 20 January 1937, de Miguel was brought up in a rural community. He became a professor of sociology at his alma mater, the Complutense University of Madrid. He was then sent to be a guest professor at the University of Valencia, the University of Barcelona, and later, Columbia University. He was also invited to teach at Yale University, the University of Florida, and El Colegio de México.

De Miguel left Catalunya in 1981 due to fear of repression after publishing a manifesto about language equality.

De Miguel also published articles in numerous journals, frequently collaborating with Colpisa, Cadena COPE, Época, La Razón, and Libertad Digital.

Amando de Miguel died in Madrid on 3 September 2023, at the age of 86.

== Publications ==
- Sociología del Franquismo : análisis ideológico de los ministros del régimen (1975)
- La España de nuestros abuelos (1995)
- Con sentido común (1996)
- Manual del perfecto sociólogo (1996)
- Autobiografía de los españoles (1997)
- El impacto de la telefonía móvil en la sociedad española (1997)
- ABC de la opinión española (1997)
- La sociedad española 1996-97 (1997)
- Opinión pública y nivel de vida (1998)
- El final de un siglo de pesimismo 1898-1998 (1998)
- El Sexo de nuestros abuelos (1998)
- Los españoles y los libros (1998)
- La movilidad urbana y los vehículos de dos ruedas (1998)
- Los madrileños y el consumo (1998)
- El libro de las preguntas (1999)
- Los madrileños y su ciudad (1999)
- Los derechos del consumidor en el municipio de Madrid (1999)
- Estudio Sociológico SANOFI: Mujeres e hipertensión (1999)
- Los peatones y el tráfico urbano (2000)
- El espíritu de Sancho Panza. El carácter español a través de los refranes (2000)
- La vida cotidiana de los españoles en el siglo XX (2001)
- Saber beber, saber vivir (2002)
- El idioma español (2002)
- El final del franquismo: testimonio personal (2003)
- Las ideas económicas de los intelectuales españoles (2003)
- Sancho Panza lee El Quijote (2004)
- La mentalidad de los españoles a comienzos del siglo XXI (2004)
- Sobre gustos y sabores: los españoles y la comida (2004)
- Servir al rey: recuerdo de la mili: 1938-2001 (2005)
- Secuestro prolongado (2005)
- El arte de envejecer (2005)
- La lengua viva (2005)
- Sociología del Quijote (2005)
- Nuestro mundo no es de este reino (2005)
- Entre los dos siglos (2005)
- Los españoles y la religión (2005)
- Hacían una pareja estupeda... (2006)
- Escritos contra corriente (2006)
- Se habla español (2009)
- La magia de las palabras (2009)
- Memorias y desahogos (2010)
- Historia de una mujer inquieta (2011)
