= Mărinești =

Mărineşti may refer to:

- Mărineşti, a village in Întregalde Commune, Alba County, Romania
- Marineşti, a village in Crușeț Commune, Gorj County, Romania
- Mărineşti, a village in Ciutuleşti Commune, Floreşti district, Moldova
- Mărineşti, a village in Sîngereii Noi Commune, Sîngerei district, Moldova

== See also ==
- Marin (name)
- Marinescu (surname)
