= Francisco A. Marcos-Marín =

Spanish linguist

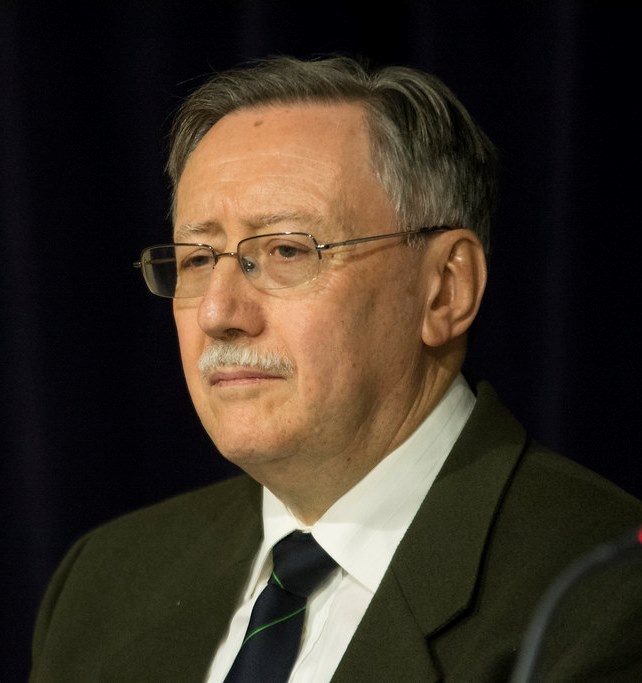
- Francisco A. Marcos-Marín in 2022
- Born: Francisco Adolfo Marcos-Marín; June 20, 1946 (age 80); Madrid, Spain
- Awards: Humboldt Research Award (2004)
- Honors: Honorary Citizen of San Antonio, Texas

Academic work
- Discipline: Linguistics, Translation studies
- Institutions: University of Texas at San Antonio (Emeritus Professor); Università di Roma "La Sapienza"; Universidad Autónoma de Madrid; Universidad de Valladolid
- Notable works: Reforma y modernización del Español (1979) Los retos del español (2006) Más allá de la ortografía (2009) Dominio y Lenguas en el Mediterráneo Occidental hasta los inicios del español (2023)

Francisco Adolfo Marcos-Marín (born June 20, 1946, Madrid) is a Spanish linguist, an Emeritus Professor of Linguistics and Translation at the University of Texas at San Antonio. Previously he was professore ordinario per chiara fama in the Università di Roma 'La Sapienza', catedrático de Lingüística General at the Universidad Autónoma de Madrid and catedrático de Historia del Español at the Universidad de Valladolid. He is a Corresponding Fellow of Academia Norteamericana de la Lengua Española and Academia Argentina de Letras, and an Honorary Citizen of San Antonio, Texas.

== Professional achievements ==
Marcos-Marín received the Humboldt Research Award in 2004. Academic Director of Instituto Cervantes (1999–2001). Director of the area of Language Industries at the Spanish National Agency for the Development of Programs for the Quincentennial (1990–1992). UNESCO Consultant in Beijing (PR China, 1981). Coordinator of the Reference Corpora of Contemporary Spanish in Argentina and Chile, and of the Oral Corpus of Centro-Peninsular Spanish. Scientific Co-Director of ADMYTE, Digital Archive of Spanish Manuscripts and Texts. Director of the Argentina-Spain cooperation project for preparing the Catálogo de la Colección Foulché-Delbosc of the National Library of Argentina and its electronic edition. Member of the Scientific Committee of the Diccionario del Español Medieval (Heidelberg Academy of Sciences and Humanities.) Membro del Consiglio Scientifico, Progetto Lingua Italiana Dante Alighieri, Società Dante Alighieri, Italy. Member of several evaluation committees in Argentina, Austria, Egypt, the European Union, Germany, Italy, Spain, Tunisia, and the United States. In 2015, he was appointed an Expert of the European Research Council.

== Evolution of his work ==
The linguistic line of his studies, which includes general linguistics and the history of linguistics, remained in parallel with historical works such as Reforma y Modernización del Español. Ensayo de Sociolingüística Histórica (1979) or on medieval texts, with the first digitally unified edition of the Libro de Alexandre (1987) and the critical edition with a modern Spanish version of the Cantar de Mio Cid (1997). Since 2004, because of his move to the United States of America, he has worked on research leading to books of a linguistic and social nature, such as Los Retos del Español or, in collaboration with Amando de Miguel, Se Habla Español. In 2009, he published Más allá de la Ortografía the first Hispanic orthography for Spanish of the United States and Latin America, which paid particular attention to Latin American speakers and their phonetic variants. He collaborated in the Enciclopedia del Español en los Estados Unidos, sponsored by the Instituto Cervantes. He was a member of the joint commission of the North American Academy and the American Association of Teachers of Spanish and Portuguese (AATSP). Since 2009, he has been collaborating with SHUMLA, an archaeology and rock art research and education institution in Texas, where he develops work as an ethnolinguist, resulting in a series of publications. He has also founded the Spanish Observatory of the United States Inc. This non-profit institution collaborates with educational and cultural services in the United States regarding contact between Spanish and English. Between 2018 and 2022, he resided in Jerusalem at the Instituto Español Bíblico y Arqueológico (Casa de Santiago) and collaborated in linguistic and archaeological studies and research.

His research on the origins of the Spanish language, especially the contacts between Arabic, Classic and Andalusi, Afro-Roman Latin, Andalusi Romance, and Ibero-Romance languages, has maintained a constant that can be exemplified by the need to replace the term Mozarabic with Andalusi Romance, following Federico Corriente, to avoid confusion of linguistic and religious or cultural domains. Since 2015, this line of research has been completed with studies that relate Berber and Afro-Romance languages, descendants of African Latin, Basque-Romance, and Andalusi Romance. These studies led in 2023 to his second PhD, also at the Complutense University, in Religious Sciences and are presented in his 2023 book: Dominio y Lenguas en el Mediterráneo Occidental hasta los Inicios del Español.

Francisco A. Marcos-Marín is the author of over thirty printed books, over three hundred papers, and reviews published in specialized journals, collective volumes, or Festschriften in several countries in different languages. He has presented over two hundred communications at international conferences and delivered more than one hundred specialized seminars or workshops in various countries. He has also published two books of poetry and several short stories and has contributed widely to American, Latin-American, and Spanish newspapers, radio, and TV broadcasts.

== Bibliography ==
=== Scholarly ===
- "Poesía Narrativa Arabe y Epica Hispánica" (1971)
- "Aproximación a la Gramática Española" (1972)
- "Lingüística y Lengua Española" (1975)
- "El Comentario Lingüístico (Metodología y Práctica)" (1977)
- "Estudios sobre el Pronombre" (1978)
- "Reforma y modernización del Español (Ensayo de Sociolingüística Histórica)" (1979)
- "Curso de Gramática Española" (1980)
- "Literatura Castellana Medieval. De las Jarchas a Alfonso X" (1980)
- "Metodología del Español como Lengua Segunda"" (1983)
- "Comentarios de Lengua Española" (1983)
- "Cantar de Mio Cid. Edición modernizada, estudio y notas" (1984)
- "Libro de Alexandre. Estudio y edición" (1987)
- "Lingüística Aplicada" with Jesús Sánchez Lobato (1988)
- "Introducción a la Lingüística: Historia y Modelos" (1990)
- "Conceptos básicos de política lingüística para España" (1994)
- "Informática y Humanidades" (1994)
- "El Comentario Filológico con Apoyo Informático" (1996)
- "Cantar de Mio Cid. Edición. (Introducción, Edición Crítica, Versión en Español moderno y notas)" (1997)
- "Gramática española" with F. Javier Satorre Grau & María Luisa Viejo Sánchez (1998)
- "Guía de gramática de la lengua española" with Paloma España Ramírez (2001)
- "Los retos del español" (2006)
- "Se habla español" with Amando de Miguel (2009)
- "Más allá de la ortografía. La primera ortografía hispánica" with Paloma España Ramírez (2009)
- "Humanidades Hispánicas. Lengua, cultura y literatura en los estudios graduados", con Daydi-Tolson, S., Membrez, N.J., Chappell, W.L., Wallace, M.L., de Miguel, A., Urrutia Gómez, J., de Diego, R., Salazar Ramírez, M.S., Benavides, A., Sánchez Díez, A., Guillot, V. (2018)
- "西班牙语语言通论 Xībānyá yǔ yǔyán tōnglùn. Teoría y práctica de la lengua Española", con Xuhua Lucía Liang (2022)
- "Dominio y Lenguas en el Mediterráneo Occidental hasta los inicios del español" (2023)

=== Poetry ===
- "Odysseos" (1999)
- "Lectura de su pluma" (2002)
