= Brian P. Wernicke =

American geologist

- Born: 26 June 1958; Los Angeles
- Alma mater: University of Southern California; Massachusetts Institute of Technology
- Employer: California Institute of Technology (1992–); Harvard University (1983–1992)
- Awards: Donath Medal (1991)
- Position held: professor

Brian Philip Wernicke (born 26 June 1958) is an American geologist and a professor of geology. He has been the Chandler Family Professor of Geology at the California Institute of Technology in Pasadena, California since 2001.

Wernicke has a BS (1978) in Geology from the University of Southern California and Ph.D. (1982) from Massachusetts Institute of Technology. He was a professor at Harvard University from September 1983 to January 1992.

Wernicke received the Young Scientist Award (Donath Medal) in 1991.
