= Espejón =

- Municipality
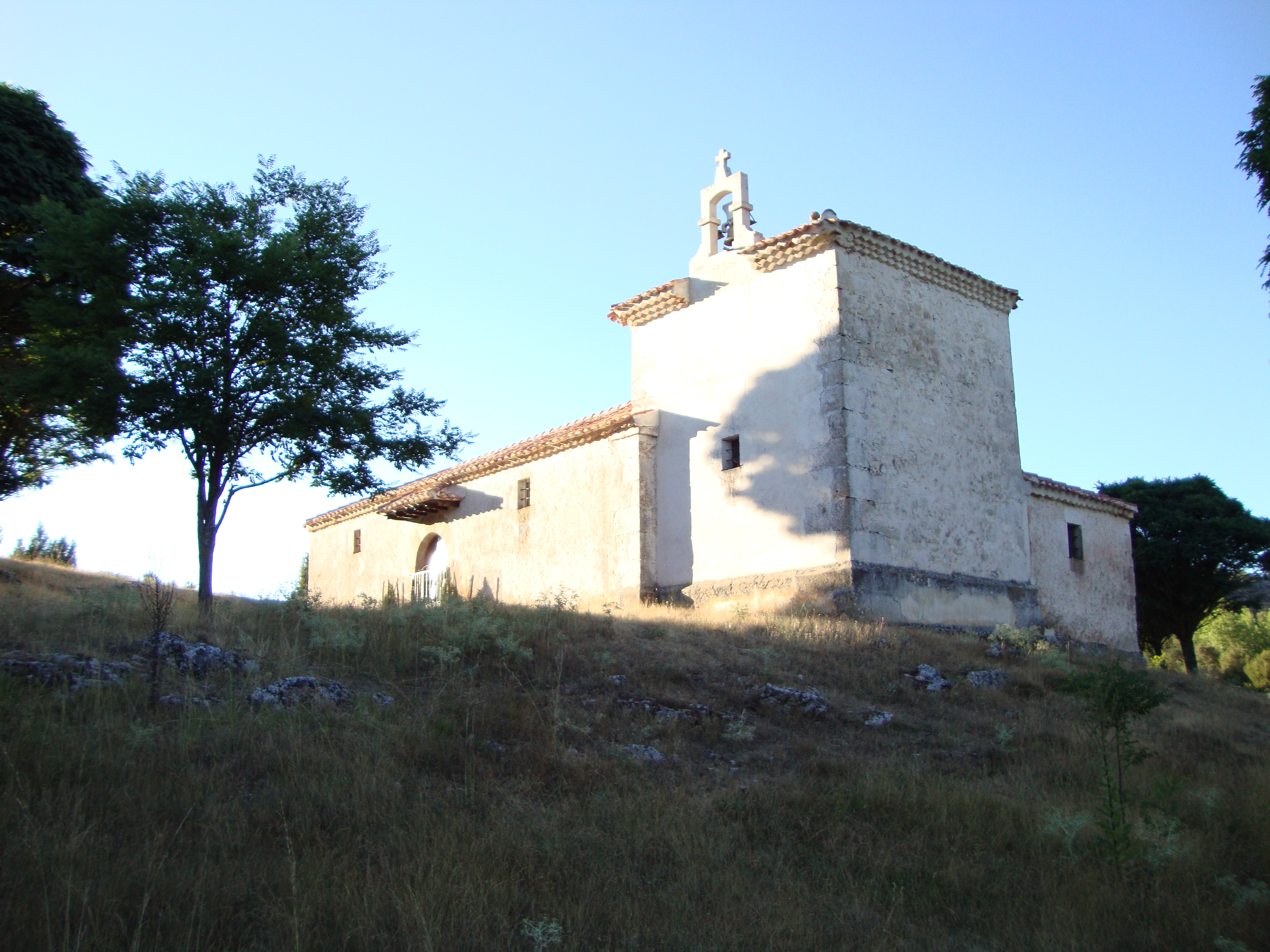

- Coat of arms

- Location in Spain. Espejón (Spain)
- Coordinates: 42°01′52″N 2°54′47″W
- Country: Spain
- Autonomous community: Castile and León
- Province: Soria
- Municipality: Espejón

Area
  - Total: 21 km^{2} (8.1 sq mi)

Population (2025-01-01)
  - Total: 122
  - Density: 5.8/km^{2} (15/sq mi)
- Time zone: UTC+1 (CET)
  - Summer (DST): UTC+2 (CEST)
- Website: Official website

Espejón is a municipality located in the province of Soria, Castile and León, Spain. According to the 2004 census (INE), the municipality has a population of 209 inhabitants.
