= José Marín =

José Marín may refer to:

- José Marín (composer) (c. 1619–1699), Spanish Baroque harpist, guitarist and composer
- José Marín (racewalker) (born 1950), retired Spanish race walker
- José Manuel Marín (born 1971), Spanish archer
- José Maria Marin (1932–2025), Brazilian politician and sports administrator
- José Miguel Marín (1945–1991), Argentine football goalkeeper
