= Marin Drăcea =

Romanian silviculturist

Marin Drăcea (October 16, 1885, Vânătorii Mici – June 14, 1958, Timișoara) was a Romanian silviculturist.

He was elected a post-mortem member of the Romanian Academy in 2010.
