= Kumamoto Prefectural Seiseikou High School =

School in Kumamoto, Japan

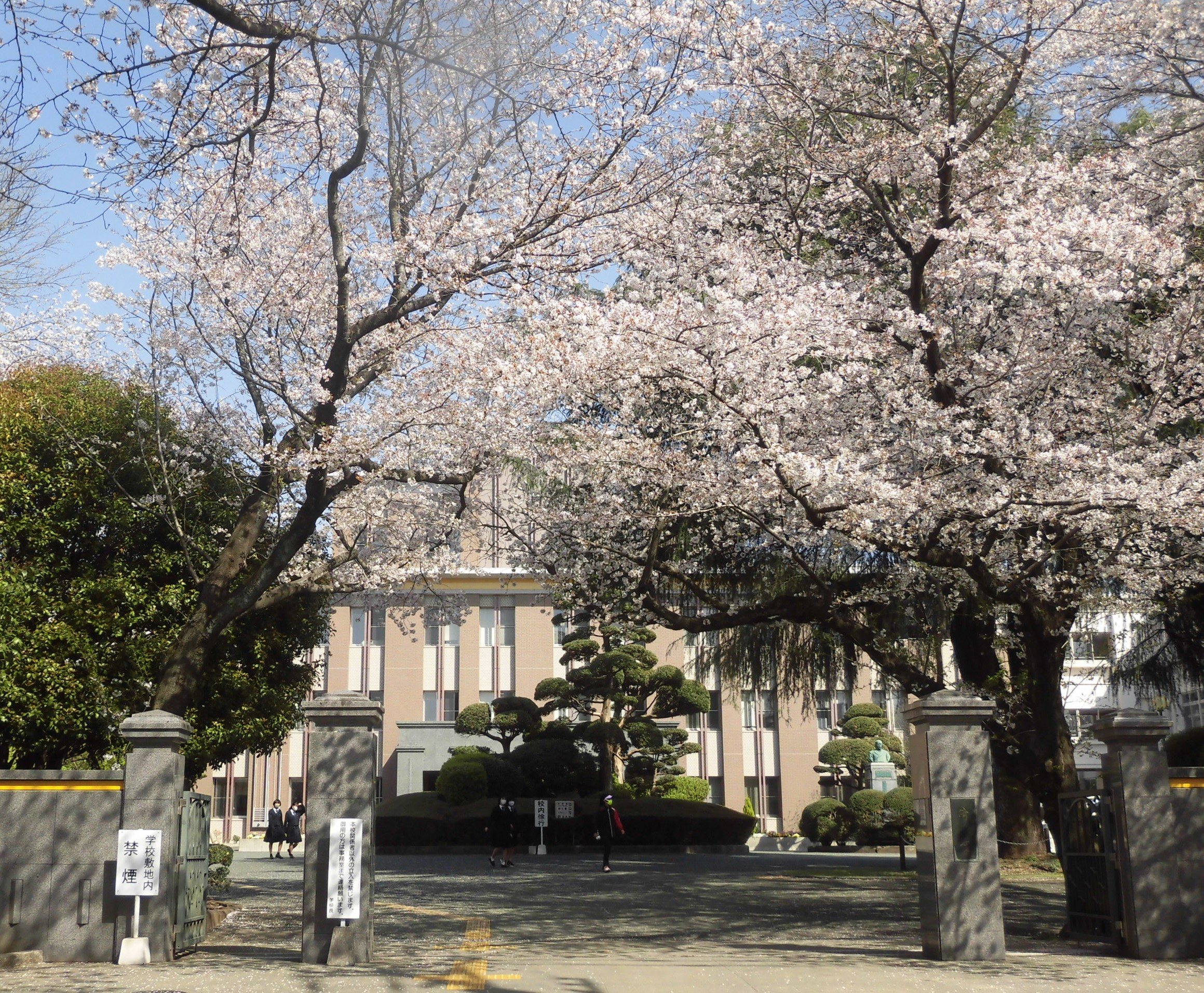
Kumamoto Seiseiko High School in 2021

Kumamoto Prefectural Seiseikou High School is a co-educational public senior high school located in Kumamoto, Kumamoto prefecture. It is one of the Super Global High Schools in Japan.

== Notable alumni ==
=== Academic ===
- Einosuke Harada
- Jun-Ichiro Mukai
- Kang Sang-jung

=== Fine Art ===
- Tetsuya Noda

=== Politics ===
- Adachi Kenzō
- Korekiyo Otsuka
- Toshio Ōtsu
- Morio Takahashi
- Toshikatsu Matsuoka
- Minoru Kihara
