= Zazuar =

Coordinates: 41°42′N 3°33′W

- municipality
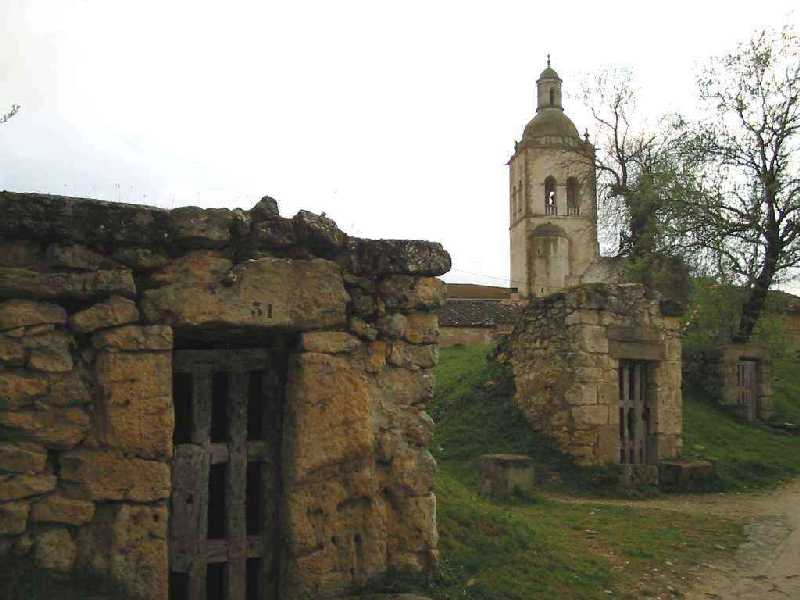
- Zazuar cellars with the Church of San Andres in the background.

- Flag Coat of arms
- Interactive map of Zazuar
- Country: Spain
- Autonomous community: Castile and León
- Province: Burgos

Area
  - Total: 22 km^{2} (8.5 sq mi)

Population (2025-01-01)
  - Total: 198
  - Density: 9.0/km^{2} (23/sq mi)
- Time zone: UTC+1 (CET)
  - Summer (DST): UTC+2 (CEST)

Zazuar (Spanish pronunciation: [θaˈθwaɾ]) is a municipality located in the province of Burgos, Castile and León, Spain. According to the 2004 census (INE), the municipality has a population of 267 inhabitants.
