= Adrián Martínez =

Adrián Martínez may refer to:

- Adrian Martinez (actor) (born 1972), American actor and comedian
- Adrian Martinez (American football) (born 2000), American football player
- Adrián Martínez (baseball) (born 1996), Mexican baseball pitcher
- Adrián Martínez (Mexican footballer) (born 1970), Mexican football goalkeeper
- Adrián Martínez (footballer, born February 1992), Argentine football right-back
- Adrián Martínez (footballer, born July 1992), Argentine football forward
- Adrián Martínez (Venezuelan footballer) (born 1993), Venezuelan football defender
