= Coruña del Conde =

- Municipality and town
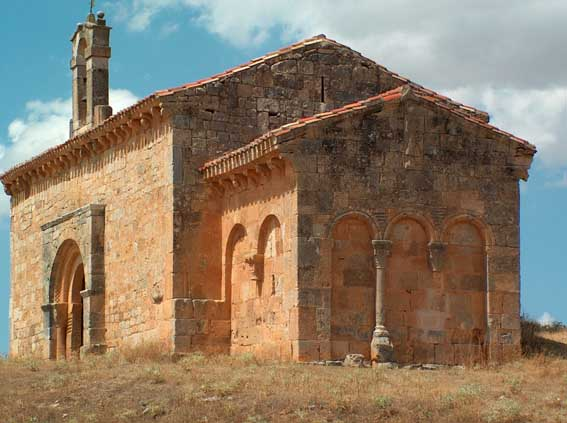
- Hermitage of Santo Cristo de San Sebastián (11th or 12th century). Its square apse is of Visigothic origin.

- Coat of arms

- Location of Coruña del Conde in Spain.
- Coordinates: 41°45′57″N 3°23′30″W
- Country: Spain
- Autonomous community: Castile and León
- Province: Burgos
- Comarca: Ribera del Duero

Government
  - Mayor: José Ángel Esteban Hernando (PP)

Area
  - Total: 32 km^{2} (12 sq mi)
- Elevation: 903 m (2,963 ft)

Population (2025-01-01)
  - Total: 95
  - Density: 3.0/km^{2} (7.7/sq mi)
- Time zone: UTC+1 (CET)
  - Summer (DST): UTC+2 (CEST)
- Postal code: 09410
- Website: Official website

Coruña del Conde is a village and municipality in the province of Burgos, Castile and León Spain. The Arandilla River runs through it.

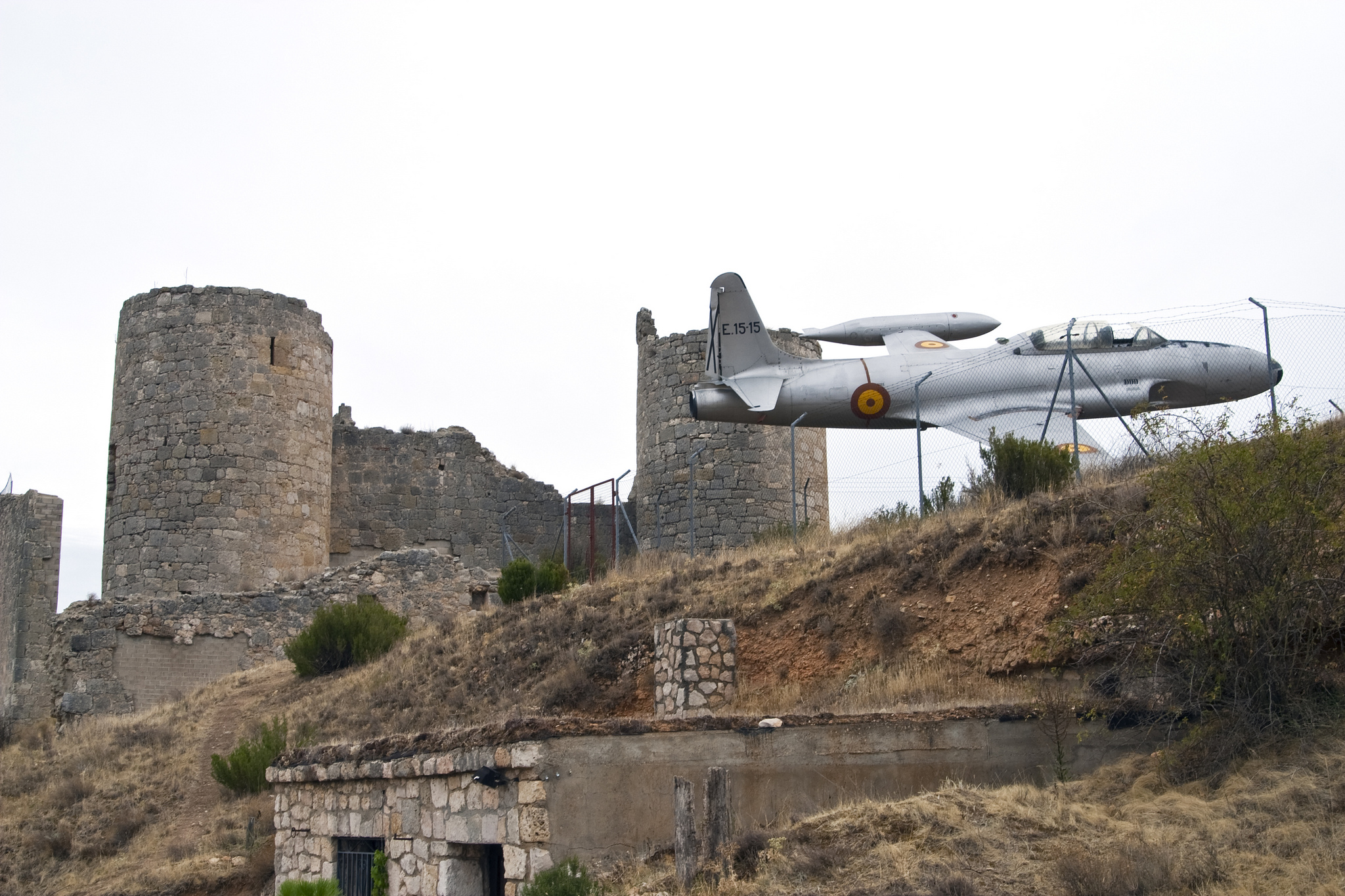
Coruña del Conde castle and plane commemorating aviation pioneer Diego Marín Aguilera

It contains the ruins of an ancient Muslim castle, later converted for use by Castilian counts, which sits atop a hill that looks over the town. It also contains the Romanesque chapel of Santo Cristo. The village claims to be the venue for the first human flight by air pioneer Diego Marín Aguilera, who was born in the town (a plane was placed by the Spanish Air Force by the castle as a reminder of this claim). It was the birthplace of Bishop Agustín of Popayán, Colombia.

Colonia Clunia Sulpicia, one of Hispania's main cities and a conventus iuridicum capital of Hispania Tarraconensis, was located 2 km away from the village. At Clunia, Emperor Galba was proclaimed emperor by his legions and from there marched to Rome. Stones from the ancient city were used in the construction of buildings of the area, such as churches, arches, walls, castles or even palaces at Peñaranda de Duero.

== People from Coruña del Conde ==
- Diego Marín Aguilera (1757–1799) - Aviation pioneer
