= Arandilla =

- Municipality and town
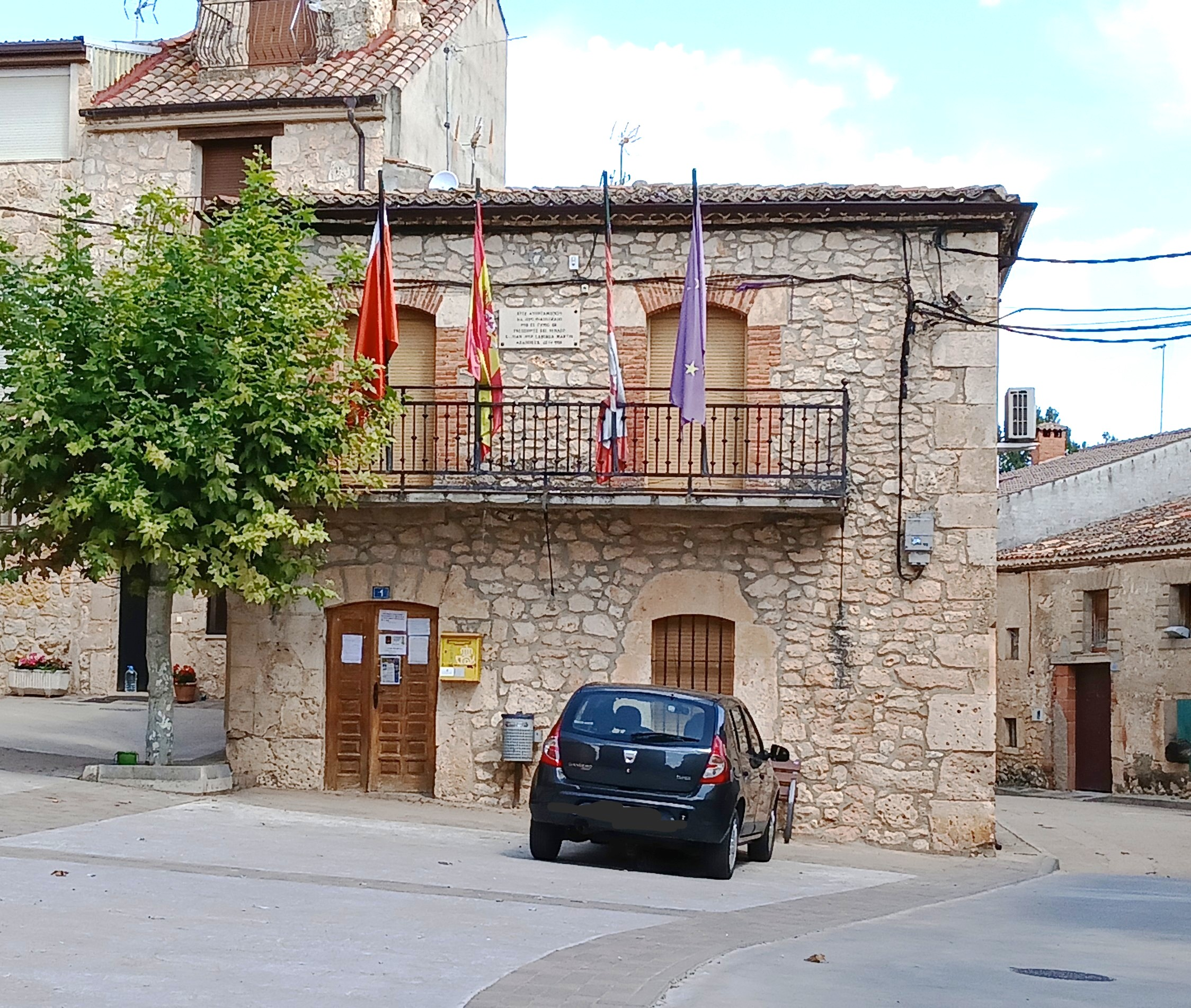
- Town hall

- Flag Coat of arms

- Location within Castile and León Location within Spain
- Coordinates: 41.737°N 3.428°W
- Country: Spain
- Autonomous community: Castile and León
- Province: Burgos
- Comarca: Ribera del Duero

Area
  - Total: 26.68 km^{2} (10.30 sq mi)
- Elevation: 887 m (2,910 ft)

Population (2004)
  - Total: 191
  - Density: 7.16/km^{2} (18.5/sq mi)
- Time zone: UTC+1 (CET)
  - Summer (DST): UTC+2 (CEST)
- Postal code: 09410
- Website: http://www.arandilla.es/

Arandilla is a municipality and town located in the province of Burgos, Castile and León, Spain. According to the 2004 census (INE), the municipality has a population of 191 inhabitants.
