= Pereruela =

Coordinates: 41°25′N 5°52′W

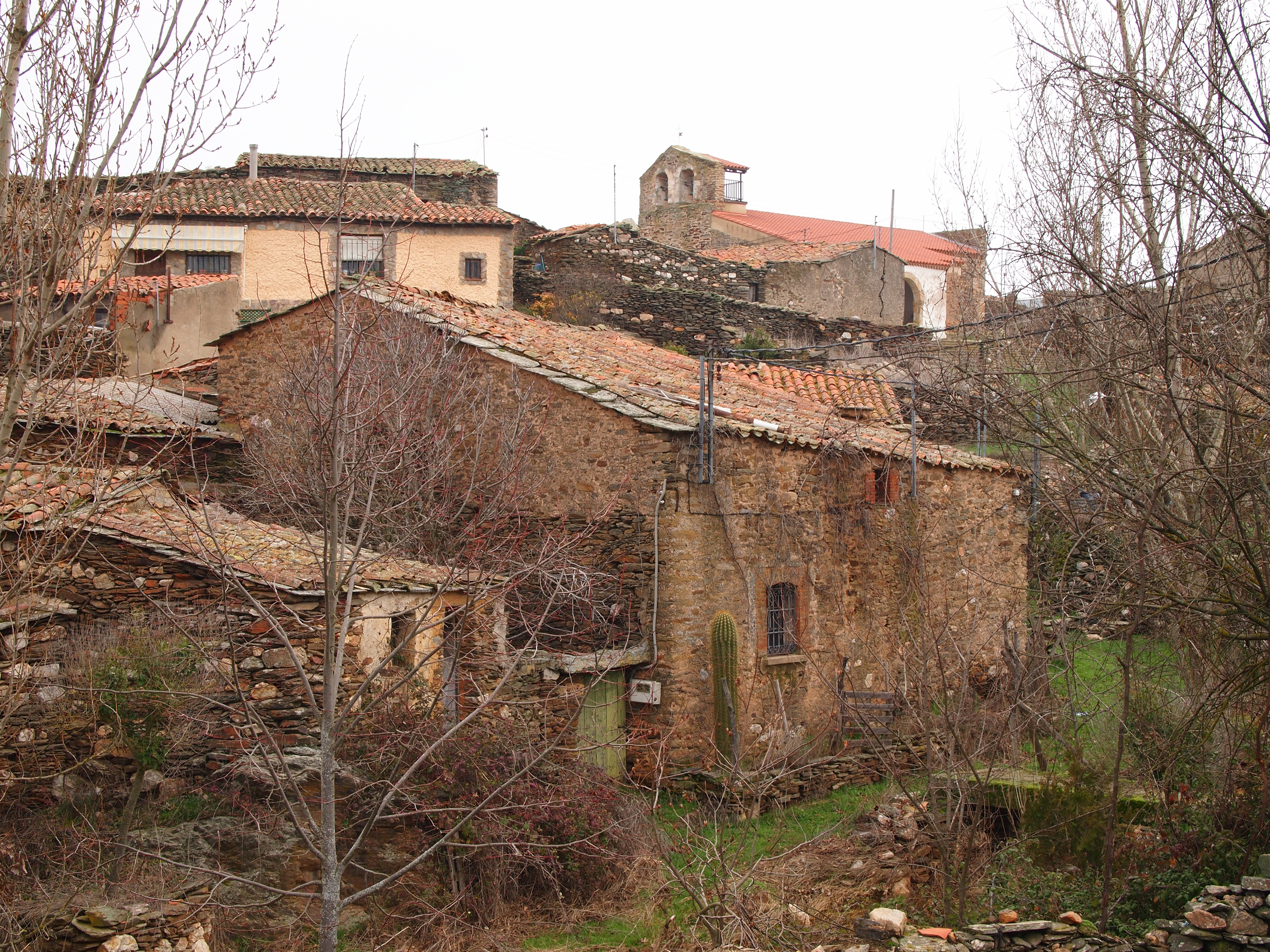
- Interactive map of Pereruela
- Country: Spain
- Autonomous community: Castile and León
- Province: Zamora
- Municipality: Pereruela

Area
  - Total: 160.86 km^{2} (62.11 sq mi)
- Elevation: 739 m (2,425 ft)

Population (2025-01-01)
  - Total: 499
  - Density: 3.10/km^{2} (8.03/sq mi)
- Time zone: UTC+1 (CET)
  - Summer (DST): UTC+2 (CEST)
- Website: Official website

Pereruela is a municipality located in the province of Zamora, Castile and León, Spain. According to the 2004 census (INE), the municipality had a population of 673 inhabitants.

== See also ==
- Arribes del Duero Natural Park
- Zamora city
- Zamora province
