= Olimpiu Blaj =

Romanian actor

Olimpiu Blaj

Olimpiu Gelu Blaj (Romanian pronunciation: [oˈlimpju ˈd͡ʒelu ˈblaʒ]; born 18 November 1986) is a Romanian actor mostly known for playing Eric in The Cosmonaut's Last Message To The Woman He Once Loved In The Former Soviet Union directed by Radu Afrim, Peter in Jesus Christ Superstar and Charlie in Flowers for Algernon directed by Miklós Bács. He also played Osip in The Government Inspector directed by Vadas Laszlo. and Steve and Lendal in Almost, Maine directed by Cristian Juncu. Olimpiu graduated the Faculty of Theatre at Babeş-Bolyai University from Cluj-Napoca (Romania) in 2011.

In 2015 Olimpiu Blaj started to work with the Scottish film director, producer and screenwriter Mick Davis on "Paganini" at "Metropolis" Theatre from Bucharest, playing the role of Paulo Vincenzo.
