= Vadocondes =

Coordinates: 41°39′N 3°34′W

- municipality
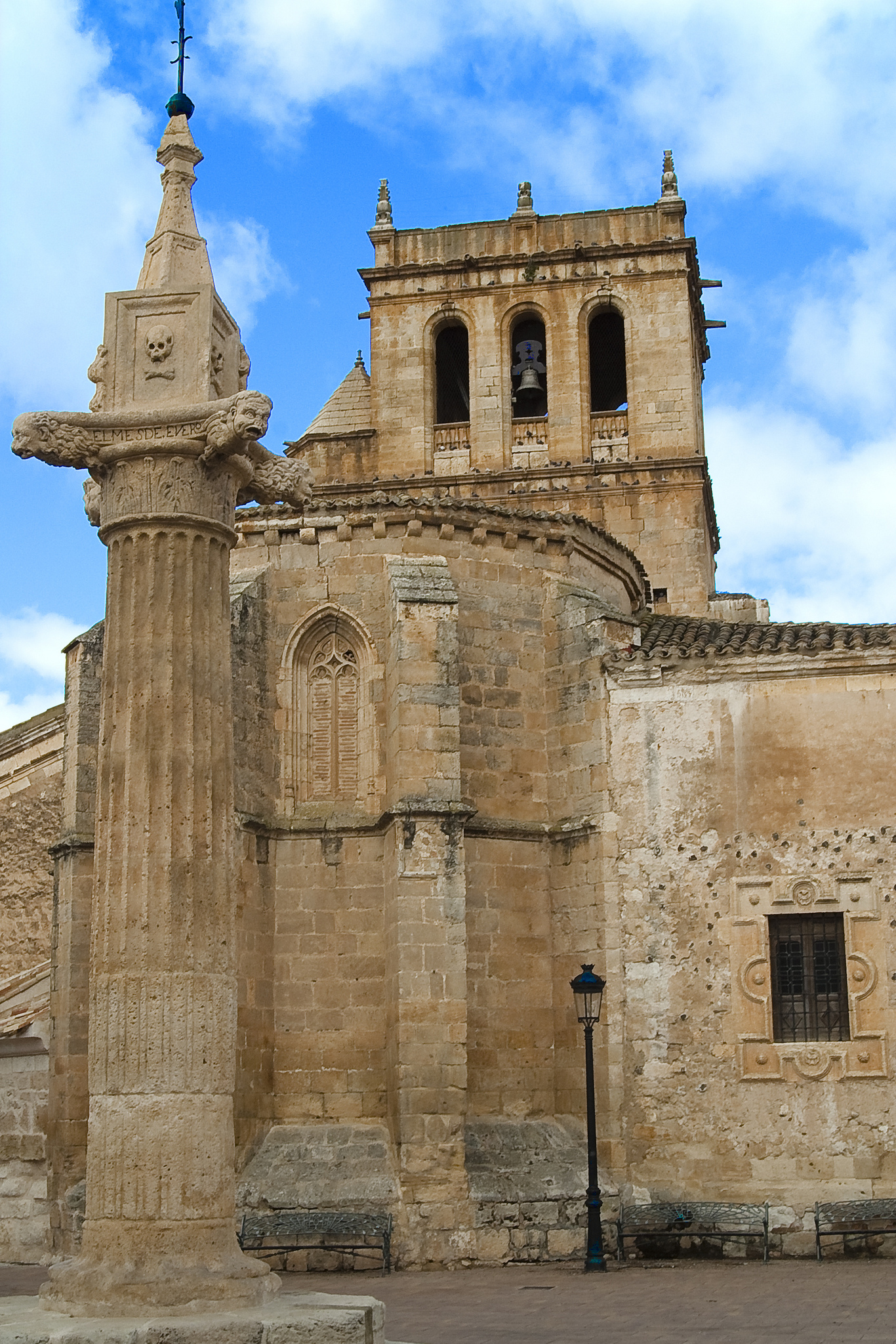

- Flag Coat of arms
- Interactive map of Vadocondes
- Country: Spain
- Autonomous community: Castile and León
- Province: Burgos

Area
  - Total: 25 km^{2} (9.7 sq mi)

Population (2025-01-01)
  - Total: 368
  - Density: 15/km^{2} (38/sq mi)
- Time zone: UTC+1 (CET)
  - Summer (DST): UTC+2 (CEST)
- Website: http://vadocondes.es

Vadocondes is a municipality located in the province of Burgos, Castile and León, Spain. It is located in the Ribera del Duero region, on the meander at the start of the River Duero. Vadocondes is about 13 kilometers from Aranda de Duero, in the direction of San Esteban de Gormaz.

Vadocondes has a surface area of 9,919 mi^{2} and according to the 2004 census (INE), the municipality has a population of 419 inhabitants. It has prehistoric vestiges and attractions such as the Monastery of Santa María de La Vid.
