= Rinus =

Rinus is a male given name, usually short for Marinus and popular in the Netherlands, and may refer to:

- Rinus van Beek (1947–2018), Dutch swimmer
- Rinus Bennaars (1931–2021), Dutch footballer
- Rinus van den Berge (1900–1972), Dutch athlete mainly in the 100 metres
- Rinus van den Bosch (1938–1996), Dutch artist
- Rinus Ferdinandusse (1931–2022), Dutch writer and journalist
- Rinus Gerritsen (born 1946), Dutch bassist
- Rinus Gosens (1920–2008), Dutch football player and manager
- Rinus Houtman (born 1942), Dutch politician
- Rinus Israël (1942–2025), Dutch football player and manager
- Rinus Michels (1928–2005), Dutch football player and coach
- Rinus Paul (born 1941), Dutch road and track cyclist
- Rinus Schaap (1922–2006), Dutch football player
- Rinus Terlouw (1922–1992), Dutch football player
- Rinus VeeKay (born 2000), Dutch open wheel race car driver
- Rinus Wortel (born 1947), Dutch geophysicist
- Zanger Rinus (born 1969), Dutch singer
