= Quemada =

Coordinates: 41°42′N 3°34′W

- Municipality and town
- Coat of arms
- Interactive map of Quemada
- Country: Spain
- Autonomous community: Castile and León
- Province: Burgos
- Comarca: Ribera del Duero

Area
  - Total: 20.835 km^{2} (8.044 sq mi)
- Elevation: 839 m (2,753 ft)

Population (2025-01-01)
  - Total: 242
  - Density: 11.6/km^{2} (30.1/sq mi)
- Time zone: UTC+1 (CET)
  - Summer (DST): UTC+2 (CEST)
- Postal code: 09454
- Website: http://www.quemada.es/

Quemada is a municipality and town located in the province of Burgos, Castile and León, Spain. According to the 2008 census (INE), the municipality has a population of 260 inhabitants.

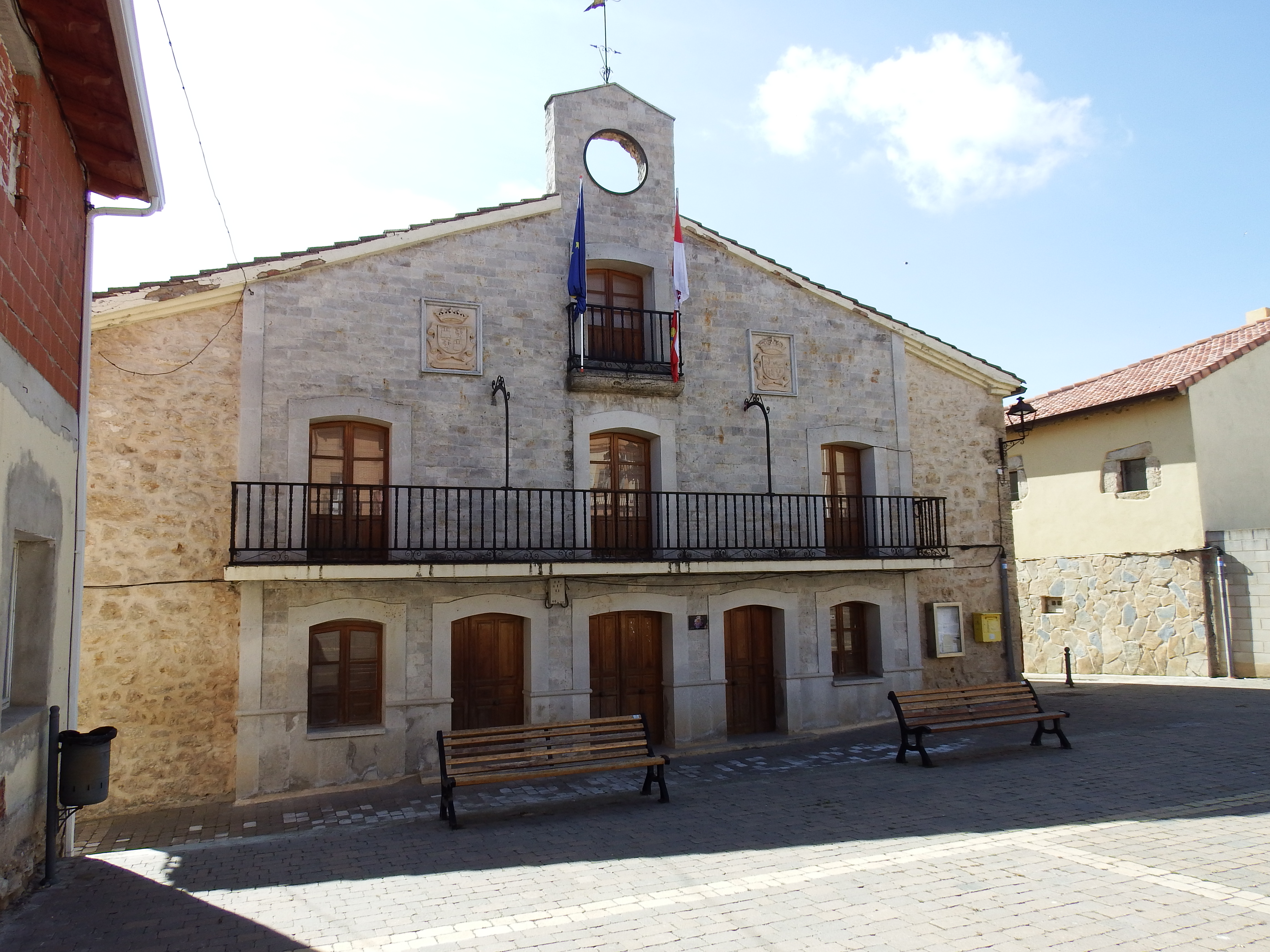
Quemada Town Hall
