= Portuñol =

Mixed Portuguese–Spanish language, especially in South America

Portuñol (Spanish spelling) or Portunhol (Portuguese spelling) is a portmanteau of the words portugués/português ("Portuguese") and español/espanhol ("Spanish") and is the name often given to any non-systematic mixture of Portuguese and Spanish (this sense should not be confused with the dialects of the Portuguese language spoken in northern Uruguay by the Brazilian border, known by several names, among them Portuñol). Close examination reveals it to be "a polyvalent term (portuñol/portunhol) used to describe a wide range of phenomena, including spontaneous contact vernaculars in border regions, errors produced by speakers attempting to speak the second language (L2) correctly, and idiosyncratic invented speech designed to facilitate communication between the two languages."

Portuñol/Portunhol is frequently a pidgin, or simplified mixture of the two languages, that allows speakers of either Spanish or Portuguese who are not proficient in the other language to communicate with one another. When speakers of one of the languages attempt to speak the other language, there is often interference from the native language, which causes the phenomenon of code-switching to occur. It is possible to conduct a moderately fluent conversation in this way because Portuguese and Spanish are closely related Romance languages. They have almost identical syntactic structures, as well as overlapping lexicons due to cognates, which means that a single macro-grammar is produced when the two mix. An example for literary effect, "not based on accurate imitations of the speech of border regions", is the phrase en el hueco de la noite longa e langue, illustrating a code-mix of the Spanish article la and the Portuguese noun noite.

== Origins ==
Language contact between Spanish and Portuguese is a result of sustained contact between the two languages in border communities and multilingual trade environments. Such regions include the border regions between Portugal and Spain in the Iberian Peninsula, as well as the ones between Brazil, whose official language is Portuguese, and most of its neighboring countries whose official languages are Spanish. Because Portuñol is a spontaneous register resulting from the occasional mixing of Spanish and Portuguese, it is highly diverse; there is no one dialect or standard of Portuñol. There does, however, tend to be a stronger presence of Spanish in Portuñol.

== Contemporary ==
In recent years, Portuñol has begun to appear in realms other than everyday speech. It has become a literary medium, especially in Argentina, Uruguay and Brazil. Language professor María Jesus Fernández García states that literary registers only occasionally provide a true representation of Portuñol and that authors often choose to select only some of the features that it is characterized by; she thus describes it as a linguistic recreation of the actual language. One important literary work written in Portuñol is Mar paraguayo by Brazilian author Wilson Bueno. The passage below shows the mixing of Spanish and Portuguese in his novel.

In recent decades, some Portuguese-based creole languages have also become influenced by standard Spanish, notably Annobonese and the Aruban dialect of Papiamento.

The appearance of Portuñol has prompted two opposing opinions or attitudes towards its existence. On the one hand, it is viewed as the product of laziness among speakers unwilling to learn a different language. On the other hand, it is seen as the logical product of globalization. As far as the future of Portuñol is concerned, according to Francisco A. Marcos-Marín, it is too difficult to evaluate possible repercussions that Portuñol could have on future linguistic maps because it is not easy to separate linguistic tendencies that are merely in style and those that are permanent.

Linguists have made some efforts to record the various forms of Portuñol that exist or have existed in the past, and there is even a popular linguistic dictionary: the Diccionario de Portuñol / Dicionário de Portunhol resulting from the Hispanoluso project.

== Sample texts ==
Portuguese	Portuñol	Spanish	Literal English translation
Hoje me vejo diante de seu olhar de morto, este homem que me faz dançar castanholas na cama, que me faz sofrer, que me faz, que me construiu de dor e sangue, o sangue que verteu minha vida amarga. Desde seus ombros, meu destino igual àquele feito de um punhal na chave direita do coração. (Note: [uno punhal] en la clave derecha del corazón ([a dagger] in the right key of the heart) does not make much sense in either language; there is, however, the expression "clavar el puñal"/"cravar o punhal" (to stab with a dagger), which would give: "un puñal clavado en la derecha del corazón"/"um punhal cravado à direita do coração" (a dagger stabbed to the right side of the heart) or "un puñal clavado derecho (or directo) en el corazón"/"um punhal cravado direito no coração" (a dagger stabbed right into the heart)) Agora neste momento, eu não sei o que falar com sua cara dura, vermelhos/roxos (Note: rojo/roxo is a false friend, meaning red in Spanish and purple in Portuguese. Because of that, it is difficult to determine which color the author had in mind.) os olhos soterrados, estes que eram meus olhos.	Hoy me vejo adelante de su olhar de muerto, este hombre que me hace dançar castanholas en la cama, que me hace sofrir, que me hace, que me há construído de dolor y sangre, la sangre que vertiô mi vida amarga. Desde sus ombros, mi destino igual quel hecho de uno punhal en la clave derecha del corazón. Ahora en neste momento, yo no sê que hablar com su cara dura, rojos los olhos soterrados, estos que eram mis ojos.	Hoy me veo delante de su mirada de muerto, este hombre que me hace bailar castañuelas en la cama, que me hace sufrir, que me hace, que me ha construido de dolor y sangre, la sangre que vertió mi vida amarga. Desde sus hombros, mi destino igual aquel hecho de un puñal en la clave derecha del corazón. Ahora en este momento, yo no sé qué hablar con su cara dura, rojos/purpurados los ojos soterrados, estos que eran mis ojos.	Today I see myself before his gaze of the dead, this man who makes me dance castanets in bed, who makes me suffer, who makes me, who has built me in pain and blood, the blood that poured my life bitter. From his shoulders, my destiny like that made by a dagger in the right key of the heart. Now at this moment, I do not know what to speak with his hard face, red/purple eyes buried, these which were my eyes.

== See also ==
- Castrapo
- Cocoliche
- Differences between Spanish and Portuguese
- Spanglish
- Surzhyk
- Svorsk
- Trasianka
