= Olimpiu Marin =

Romanian sports shooter

Personal information
- Nationality: Romanian
- Born: 6 March 1969 (age 56)

Sport
- Sport: Sports shooting

Olimpiu Marin (born 6 March 1969) is a Romanian sports shooter. He competed in two events at the 1992 Summer Olympics.
