= Marijn Backer =

Dutch educator, poet, and writer

- Born: Marinus Franciscus Johannes Backer; September 6, 1956 (age 69); Leiden, Netherlands
- Spouse: Maria van Dreven
- Relatives: Joris Backer (cousin)
- Writing career
- Years active: Since 1986 or earlier
- Notable works: Lieve engerd, de groetjes
- Notable awards: Zilveren Griffel
- Website: marijnbacker.nl

Marinus Franciscus Johannes "Marijn" Backer (born 6 September 1956) is a Dutch educator, poet, and writer.

Backer has been publishing poetry, including in translation, since at least 1986. In 1992 he won the Zilveren Griffel prize with Inez van Eijk for his first children's book, Lieve engerd, de groeten. Backer has been publishing youth literature ever since and occasionally engages in nonfiction. His poems are still published on his website. Two of Backer's books have been published in German translation. His poems were published in 18 languages.

Backer is a dean and a teacher of Greek and Latin at the Werkplaats Kindergemeenschap. He is an author of the teaching method Fortuna for Latin. In the 2000s, he wrote a biweekly column on education for NRC Handelsblad.

== Books ==
=== Youth literature ===
- 1992 – Lieve engerd, de groetjes [Contact], co-author: Inez van Eijk
- 1995 – Thuis niet thuis [Piramide]
- 1996 – Ik hou waar ik van hou [Piramide]
- 1998 – Dossier Wauter Both [Piramide]
- 2003 – Schrijf me! [De Fontein], co-author: Inez van Eijk, updated version of Lieve engerd, de groeten
- 2006 – Kijk niet om [Leopold]
- 2008 – Ik ben van niemand [Leopold]
- 2009 – Het geheim van de verdwenen dieren [Leopold]
- 2010 – Het jaar van de leugen [Leopold], published in German as Das Jahr der Lügen (2014, Urachhaus)
- 2012 – Watermeisje [Leopold]
- 2016 – Toen de vogels kwamen [Leopold]

=== Nonfiction ===
- 2002 – Claus en Manuel [CP Pers], published in German as Claus und Manuel
- 2005 – Fortuna Lesboek 1 [Eisma Edumedia]
- 2005 – Fortuna Werkboek 1 [Eisma Edumedia]
- 2007 – "Het werk van de docent: over nieuw leren, oud leren en begeleiden" in Zijlstra, Henk: Het studiehuis leert, pages 39–44 [Garant]

=== Poetry ===
- 1991 – Het oog van de veeboer [Contact]
- 1996 – Opdracht [CP Pers]
- 2000 – Een takje tussen je tanden [CP Pers]
- 2000 – Aan de koolstofconditioner [Wagner & van Santen]

== Honors and awards ==
- 1992 – Zilveren Griffel - Lieve engerd, de groetjes
- 1995 – Gouden Uil long list - Thuis niet thuis
- 2007 – Gouden Zoen honorary mention - Kijk niet om
