= Leigh Royden =

American geologist

Leigh "Wiki" Handy Royden (born October 15, 1955) is an American geologist.

== Early life ==
Royden was born on October 15, 1955, in Palo Alto, California. Royden's father was Halsey Royden, a mathematician.

== Education ==
Royden received an A.B. degree in physics from Harvard University and a PhD in geology and geophysics from the Massachusetts Institute of Technology (MIT).

== Career ==
Royden became a member of the faculty at MIT in 1984. She is the director of MIT's Experimental Study Group.

Royden has published on thermal subsidence at the northeastern continental margin of North America and on retreating subduction boundaries formed during the collision of continental tectonic plates. Royden has also contributed to research attributing the rapid northward continental drift of the Indian plate to the combination of two subduction zones.

In 1994, Royden was one of 16 women faculty in the School of Science at MIT who drafted and co-signed a letter to the then-Dean of Science (now Chancellor of Berkeley) Robert Birgeneau, which started a campaign to highlight and challenge gender discrimination at MIT.

Royden is the chair of the Geology and Geochemistry Program, as well as a professor of geology and geophysics. As of 2026, she is also the Chair of the EAPS Diversity Council, and on the committee for the Donath Medal Geological Society of America.

== Awards and honors ==
In 1990, she was awarded the Donath Medal (Young Scientist Award) by the Geological Society of America. Royden was named a fellow of the American Geophysical Union in 2004. In 2009, Royden was also named a fellow of the Harvard Radcliffe Institute. In 2011, she received the George P. Woollard Award. In 2013, she was awarded the Stephan Mueller Medal by the European Geosciences Union. In 2018, she was named to the American Academy of Arts and Sciences. In 2019, Royden was awarded the Walter H. Bucher Medal by the American Geophysical Union (AGU).

== Sport ==
In 1973, Royden was the Stroke (position) on Radcliffe College's first national championship boat.

Royden won silver with the U.S. eight at the 1975 World Rowing Championships, and became US champion in the single sculls in 1975.

She missed out on taking part in the 1976 Summer Olympics due to an ankle injury, and accepted an offer of a summer internship at MIT instead.

Royden was inducted into the Harvard Varsity Club Hall of Fame in 1997.
