= San Juan del Monte, Province of Burgos =

San Juan del Monte
- Municipality and town
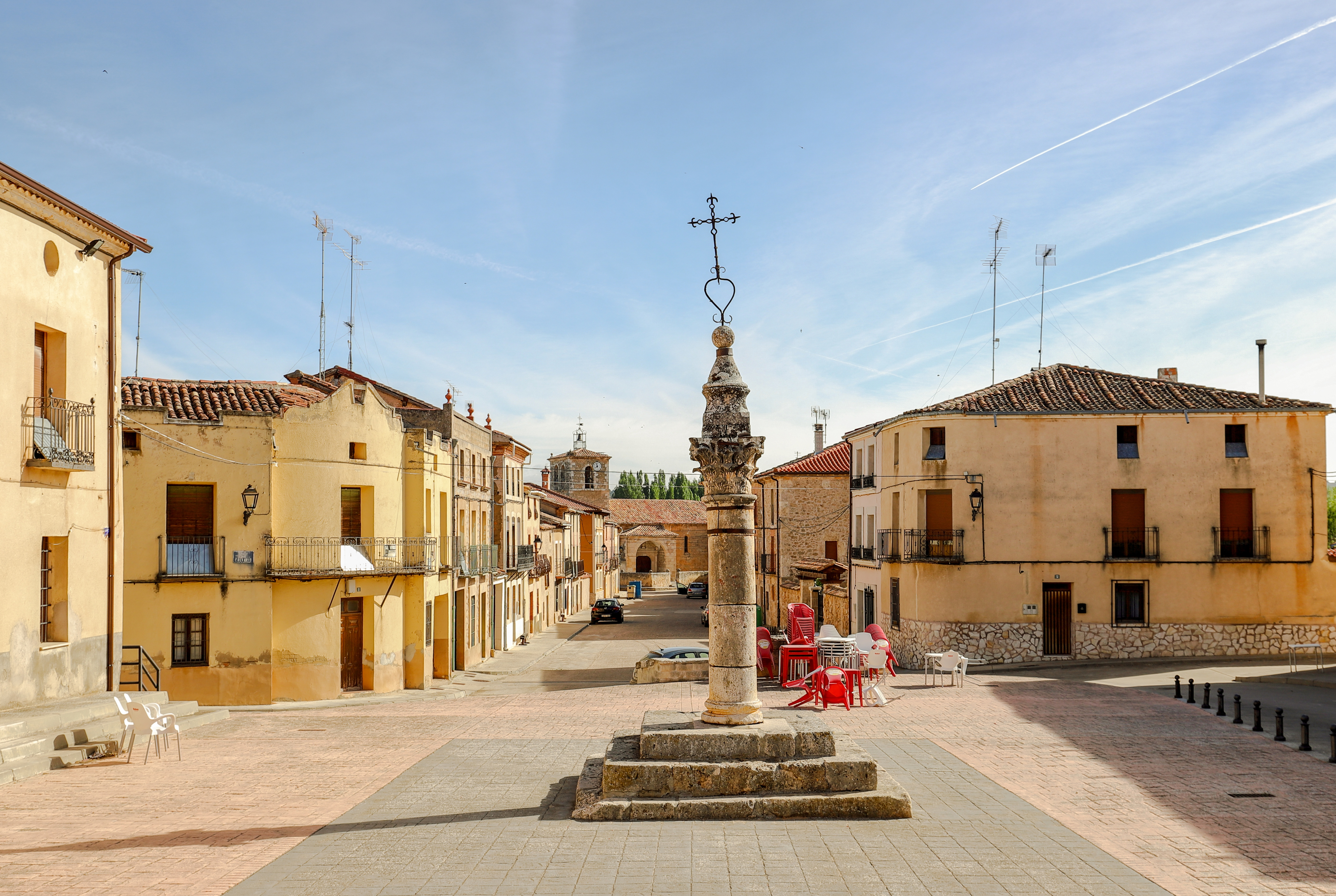

- Coat of arms
- Interactive map of San Juan del Monte
- Coordinates: 41°41′03″N 3°31′16″W
- Country: Spain
- Autonomous community: Castile and León
- Province: Burgos
- Comarca: Ribera del Duero

Area
  - Total: 26.5 km^{2} (10.2 sq mi)
- Elevation: 840 m (2,760 ft)

Population (2025-01-01)
  - Total: 163
  - Density: 6.15/km^{2} (15.9/sq mi)
- Time zone: UTC+1 (CET)
  - Summer (DST): UTC+2 (CEST)
- Postal code: 09490
- Website: http://sanjuandelmonte.burgos.es/

San Juan del Monte is a municipality and town located in the province of Burgos, Castile and León, Spain.
