= Francis Birch Lecture =

The Francis Birch Lecture is an annual lecture constituting the highest honor in tectonophysics from the American Geophysical Union (AGU). The lecture is named in honor of Francis Birch, famous as a pioneer of solid Earth geophysics. The Birch Lecture, inaugurated in 1992, is presented at the AGU autumn meeting by a recipient whose research has significantly contributed to tectonophysics "through observations, experiments, the development of analytical methods or modeling."

The Birch Lecture forms part of the AGU's Bowie Lecture Series, established in 1989. The AGU's highest honor is the William Bowie Medal, named in honor of William Bowie — the AGU's first president with an international reputation in geodesy, geophysics, and engineering.

The AGU invites the Birch Lecturer and does not accept nominations for the Birch Lectureship.

== Birch Lecturers ==
Name	Institution	Year	Lecture Title
Thomas A. Herring	Massachusetts Institute of Technology	1992	Space Geodetic Studies of the Earth's Interior
James R. Rice	Harvard University	1993	Problems in Earthquake Source Mechanics
no lecture		1994	
Harry W. Green II	University of California, Davis	1995	The mechanisms of Deep Earthquakes
Ross S. Stein	United States Geological Survey, Menlo Park	1996	Stress Triggering of Earthquakes, or Playing Prediction with Less than Half a Deck
Donald W. Forsyth	Brown University	1997	Melting and Mantle Flow Beneath Mid-Ocean Ridges: Constraints from the Seismological Component of the MELT Experiment
Richard G. Gordon	Northwestern University	1998	The Plate Tectonic Approximation: Plate Nonrigidity and Diffuse Plate Boundaries
Paul Tapponnier	Institut de Physique du Globe de Paris	1999	Localisation and Propagation of Lithospheric Shear Zones Behaviour of the Continental Mantle During Collision, and Growth of the Tibet Plateau
no lecture		2000	
Louise H. Kellogg	University of California, Davis	2001	Structure and Dynamics An Earth Odyssey
Gerald Schubert	UCLA	2002	A Geophysicist's Journey to the Center of the Earth
W. Roger Buck	Lamont–Doherty Earth Observatory (LDEO)	2003	Splitting, Stretching and Spreading of Lithosphere
Shun-Ichiro Karato	Yale University	2004	Where on Earth is the Ocean?
Leigh Royden	Massachusetts Institute of Technology	2005	Uplift and Evolution of the Eastern Tibetan Plateau
Claude P. Jaupart	Institut de Physique du Globe de Paris	2006	The Deep Roots of Continents
Jean-Philippe Avouac	California Institute of Technology	2007	Mountain Ranges and the Deformation of Continents
Suzanne M. Carbotte	Columbia University	2008	Focusing in on Mid-Ocean Ridge Segmentation
Jerry X. Mitrovica	Earth and Planetary Sciences, Harvard University	2009	A Eulogy for Eustasy
Wang-Ping Chen	University of Illinois Urbana-Champaign	2010	Global Tectonics Ties Quakes, Rocks, and Volatiles in the Mantle Transition Zone
Michael Manga	University of California, Berkeley	2011	Hydrological Response to Earthquakes (and was the LUSI Mud Volcano Eruption in Indonesia Caused by an Earthquake?)
Richard H. Sibson	Otago University	2012	Inside a Crustal Earthquake — Signals from Field Geology
Roland Bürgmann	University of California, Berkeley	2013	M9 Megathrust Earthquake Cycles
David Bercovici	Yale University	2014	On the Origin of Plate Tectonics
Kelin Wang	Pacific Geoscience Center, Geological Survey of Canada	2015	Subduction Faults as We See Them in the 21st Century
Maya Tolstoy	Lamont–Doherty Earth Observatory	2016	Taking the Pulse of Mid-Ocean Ridges
Greg Hirth	Brown University	2017	Lithospheric Strength and Stress State: Persistent Challenges and New Directions in Geodynamics
Carolina R. Lithgow-Bertelloni	UCLA	2018	The inevitable control of Earth's deep interior on the surface
Claudio Faccenna	Roma Tre University / University of Texas at Austin	2019	Shaping the Mediterranean from the inside out
Christie D. Rowe	McGill University	2020	Walking the seismogenic zone: A field geology perspective on earthquakes
Taras Gerya	ETH Zürich	2021	New geodynamic processes and phenomena discovered with numerical modeling: examples and recipes
Demian M. Saffer	University of Texas Institute for Geophysics	2022	Fluids, Friction, and the Offshore Subduction Megathrust
Philippe Agard	Sorbonne Université	2023	

== See also ==
- List of geology awards
- List of geophysics awards
