= Demian Saffer =

Geophysicist researcher

Demian M. Saffer is an American geophysicist based at The University of Texas at Austin where he is director of the University of Texas Institute for Geophysics and professor at the Department of Geological Sciences of the Jackson School of Geosciences. He studies the role of fluids and friction in the mechanics of subduction megathrust earthquakes.

== Education ==
Saffer is an alumnus (geology) of Williams College in Massachusetts. He earned a Ph.D. in Earth Sciences from the University of California, Santa Cruz.

== Career and Impact ==
After finishing grad school, Saffer was briefly at USGS before joining the University of Wyoming in 2001 followed by Pennsylvania State University in 2005. At Penn State, he was appointed Professor in 2012, head of graduate programs in 2016, then head of the department of geosciences in 2018. He left Penn State in 2020 to become director of the University of Texas Institute for Geophysics.

Saffer is heavily involved in the scientific ocean drilling community and has been co-chief scientist of five major scientific ocean drilling expeditions to investigate large earthquake faults at the Pacific "Ring of Fire", including the deepest scientific drilling of a subduction zone. His discoveries include previously undetected shallow slow-slip events at Japan's Nankai fault, lower than expected stresses at Nankai, and that clay minerals in fault gouge play a much smaller role in fault slip behavior than previously thought. He is also an executive steering committee member of Subduction Zones in Four Dimensions (SZ4D), a multinational initiative to investigate the processes that underlie subduction zone hazards and was one of the architects of its latest report. From 2016 until 2020, when it wound up, he chaired the GeoPRISMS program — an international, cross-disciplinary effort to bring terrestrial and marine scientists together to investigate continental margins.

== Awards and honors ==
- In 2005, Saffer was awarded the Donath Medal, an early career scientist award offered by the Geological Society of America.
- In 2009, he was one of twenty Friedrich Wilhelm Bessel Research Awardees, Alexander von Humboldt Foundation.
- In 2011, his research on clay minerals at Japan's Nankai fault earned him The Island Arc Award, a best paper award from Wiley Blackwell
- In 2022, Saffer was selected to give American Geophysical Union's Francis Birch Lecture, its highest honor in the field of tectonophysics.

== Selected Work ==
A list of most cited works.

- Moore, J.C., Saffer, D.M., 2001. Updip limit of the seismogenic zone beneath the accretionary prism of southwest Japan: An effect of diagenetic to low-grade metamorphic processes and increasing effective stress. Geology 29 (2), 183-186.
- Saffer, D.M., Marone, C., 2003. Comparison of smectite-and illite-rich gouge frictional properties: application to the updip limit of the seismogenic zone along subduction megathrusts. Earth and Planetary Science Letters 215 (1-2), 219-235.
- Saffer, D.M., Tobin, H.J., 2011. Hydrogeology and mechanics of subduction zone forearcs: Fluid flow and pore pressure. Annual Review of Earth and Planetary Sciences 39, 157-186.
- Ikari, M.J., Saffer, D.M., Marone, C., 2009. Frictional and hydrologic properties of clay‐rich fault gouge. Journal of Geophysical Research: Solid Earth 114 (B5).
- Ikari, M.J., Marone, C., Saffer, D.M., 2011. On the relation between fault strength and frictional stability. Geology 39 (1), 83-86.
- Leeman, J.R., Saffer, D.M., Scuderi, M.M., Marone, C., 2016. Laboratory observations of slow earthquakes and the spectrum of tectonic fault slip modes. Nature communications 7 (1), 1-6.
- Carpenter, B.M., Marone, C., Saffer, D.M., 2011. Weakness of the San Andreas Fault revealed by samples from the active fault zone. Nature Geoscience 4 (4), 251-254.
- Saffer, D.M., Wallace, L.M., 2015. The frictional, hydrologic, metamorphic and thermal habitat of shallow slow earthquakes. Nature Geoscience 8 (8), 594-600.
- Araki, E., Saffer, D.M., Kopf, A.J., Wallace, et al., 2017. Recurring and triggered slow-slip events near the trench at the Nankai Trough subduction megathrust. Science 356 (6343), 1157-1160.
