= Geological Institute of the Russian Academy of Sciences =

Russian Academy of Sciences. Moscow, Russia

- Геологический институт РАН
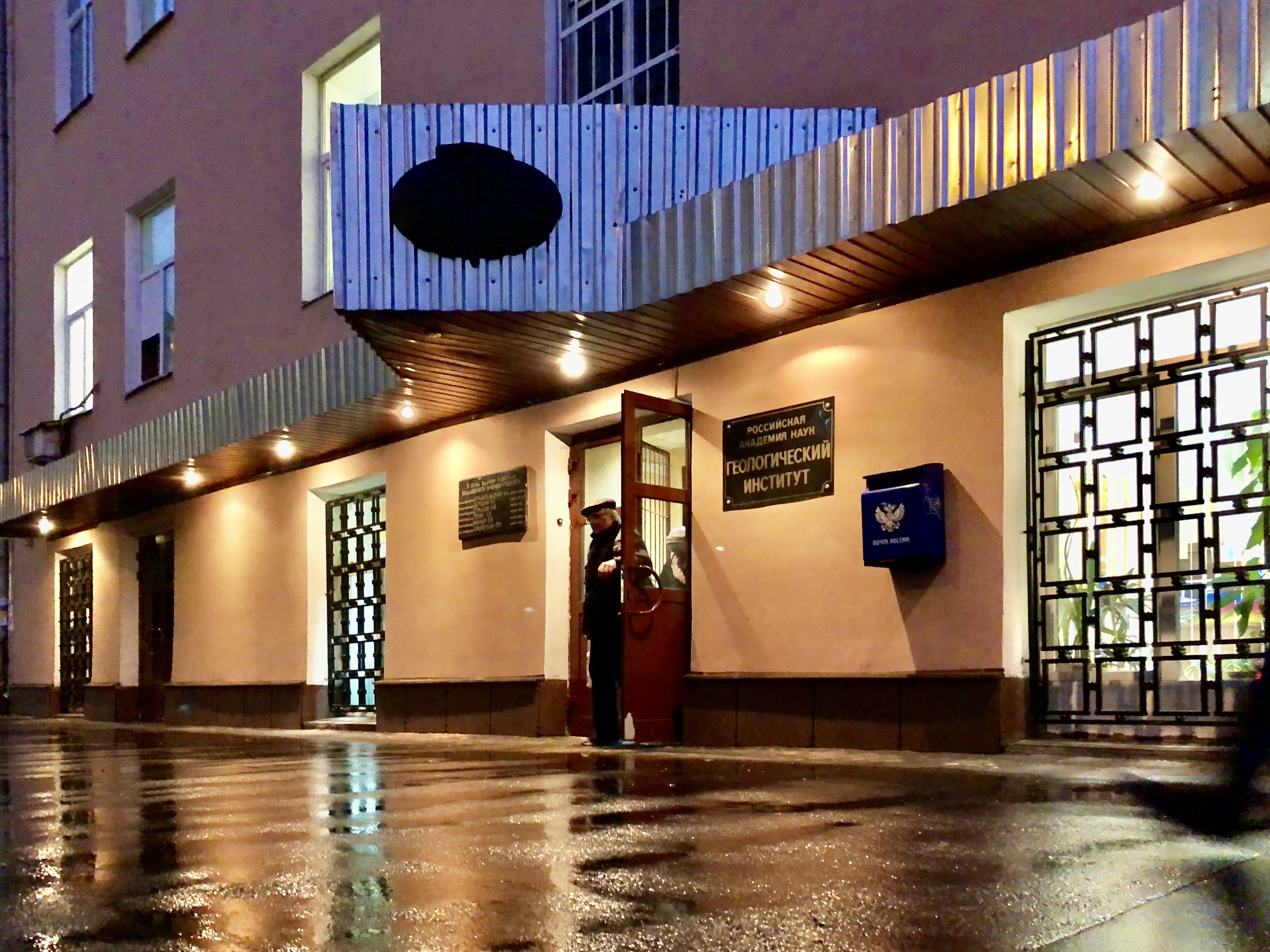
- The Geological Institute building in 2019
- Abbreviation: GIN RAS
- Formation: March 8, 1930
- Type: RAS Institute
- Headquarters: Moscow, Russia
- Fields: Geology, Tectonics, Lithology, Stratigraphy
- Website: www.ginras.ru

The Geological Institute of the Russian Academy of Sciences (GIN RAS; Russian: Геологический институт РАН, full name: Federal State Budgetary Institution of Science Geological Institute of the Russian Academy of Sciences) is a scientific institution of the Russian Academy of Sciences focusing on general theoretical and fundamental problems in the geological sciences. The main research areas of the institute are tectonics, lithology, stratigraphy, and Quaternary geology.

By the end of 2020, GIN RAS had 247 research staff, including 99 Candidates of Science and 56 Doctors of Science. The Institute employed 3 Corresponding Members, 3 Academicians of the RAS, and 5 Honored Scientists of the Russian Federation.

== Main research areas ==
- Global and regional stratigraphic schemes based on a complex of methods.
- Isotope geochemistry of sedimentary rocks and chemostratigraphy.
- Interaction of geological, geochemical, and biotic factors during sedimentogenesis.
- Features of sedimentogenesis and lithogenesis in structures of various types.
- Tectonic and geodynamic models of the formation and evolution of the Earth's lithosphere and the main types of continental and oceanic structures.
- Neotectonics and modern geodynamics as a basis for forecasting natural and man-made disasters.
- Intraplate tectonics and geodynamics, evolution of the consolidated crust.
- Geology of the World Ocean floor.
- Sedimentary basins: structure, evolution, primary and secondary concentrations of mineral resources; modeling.
- Global correlations and models of geological processes and events, directional changes and the role of rapid changes and catastrophes in Earth's history.
- Paleoclimates of the Late Precambrian – Phanerozoic: evolution of zonality, dynamics, consequences of climatic changes.
- Interaction in the biota – geological environment – tectonics – climate – ore formation system during key epochs of geological history and biosphere history.
- Geology and metallogeny of the Arctic (since 2024).
- History of geological sciences

== History ==
=== Geological Institute (1930–1937) ===
On January 12, 1929, major elections of new academicians were held at the USSR Academy of Sciences.

On May 15, 1929, the General Assembly of the USSR Academy of Sciences heard a report by Academician A. A. Borisyak on the fundamental reorganization of the Geological Museum of the USSR Academy of Sciences in Leningrad with the aim of creating several institutes on its basis.

On March 8, 1930, the Geological Museum was divided into three independent institutes, forming:

1. Geological Institute of the USSR Academy of Sciences (GIN USSR Academy of Sciences)
2. Paleozoological Institute of the USSR Academy of Sciences (PIN USSR Academy of Sciences)
3. Petrographic Institute of the USSR Academy of Sciences (PETRIN USSR Academy of Sciences)

The first director of the Geological Institute of the USSR Academy of Sciences in Leningrad was elected at a meeting of the Department of Physical and Mathematical Sciences of the USSR Academy of Sciences: Academician V. A. Obruchev (April 3, 1930), approved in this position by the General Assembly of the USSR Academy of Sciences. S. A. Gatuev was appointed deputy director.

The tasks of the new institute included:

- Geological study of the USSR and adjacent countries.
- Development of stratigraphy issues.
- Study of modern marine sediments.
- Development of comparative lithology issues.
- Compilation of summary works on the geology of the USSR.
- Organization of a geological museum.

By the end of September 1930, the main directions of the institute's activities were defined for the study of:

- Geology of Central Asia.
- Geology of the polar regions of the USSR.
- Geology of the sea floor, and in particular, sediments of the Caspian Sea.
- Quaternary period deposits.
- Conducting paleophytological work.

By 1931, the institute's staff consisted of 15 scientific and 13 technical workers. The institute housed a geological museum and workshops.

In 1932, the first volume of a new serial geological publication, "Proceedings of the Geological Institute of the USSR Academy of Sciences," was published; M. B. Edemsky was appointed as the editorial staff member.

At a meeting of the Presidium of the USSR Academy of Sciences on February 23, 1933, the heads of departments were appointed:

- D. V. Nalivkin – Stratigraphy and deputy director (1933–1934).
- V. A. Obruchev – Lithogenesis and Geology of Mineral Resources.
- D. I. Mushketov – Tectonics and Geomorphology in connection with Tectonics.
- N. N. Slavyanov – Hydrogeology.
- G. A. Bonch-Osmolovsky – Study of the Quaternary Period.

In 1934, the Institute moved from Leningrad to Moscow, changing its staff and research topics:

- Providing a research base for prospecting and geological exploration work.
- Studying the mineral resources of the most economically important regions of the USSR.
- Studying engineering-geological and hydrogeological issues in connection with major construction projects.

The institute was the organizing center for the preparation of the 17th session of the International Geological Congress (Moscow, 1937).

In the autumn of 1937, a new structure of the institute was formed, with the following departments (and their heads):

- Paleontology and Stratigraphy (M. F. Neiburg)
- Comparative Lithology (N. M. Strakhov)
- Tectonics (N. S. Shatsky)
- Geology of Ore Deposits (I. F. Grigoriev)
- Quaternary Geology (G. F. Mirchink)
- Engineering Geology and Hydrogeology (F. P. Savarensky), with sub-departments of Hydrogeology (G. N. Kamensky) and Geology of Permafrost (M. I. Sumgin)

Laboratories:

- Study of Physical-Mechanical Properties of Rocks (V. M. Fayntsimmer)
- Dynamics of Underground Waters (G. N. Kamensky)
- Study of Permafrost in Rocks (M. I. Sumgin)
- Chemical-Analytical (E. S. Zalmanzon)
- Mechanical Analysis (M. A. Zhirkevich)
- Heavy Mineral Analysis (N. V. Frolova)
- Spectral Analysis (N. V. Lizunov)
- Thin Section Preparation (A. Y. Kraynyukova).

=== Institute of Geological Sciences (1937–1956) ===
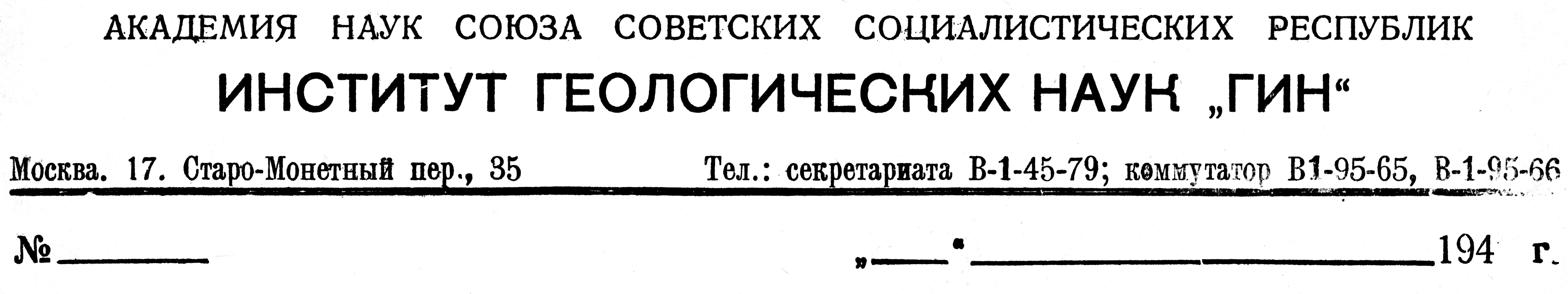
Institute of Geological Sciences of the USSR Academy of Sciences (GIN)

On November 17, 1937, after the 17th session of the International Geological Congress in Moscow, the SNK USSR (according to the Third Five-Year Plan) decided to reorganize geological institutions within the USSR Academy of Sciences. In December 1937, the following were merged into the Institute of Geological Sciences of the USSR Academy of Sciences (IGN USSR Academy of Sciences or "GIN"):

- Geological Institute
- Petrographic Institute
- Institute of Geochemistry, Mineralogy, and Crystallography named after M.V. Lomonosov
- The Mineralogical Museum and the Geological Museum were also merged into the "Geological Museum named after A. P. Karpinsky," as a department within the Institute of Geological Sciences..

The united institute began working in 4 main areas:

1. Compiling a general summary of works on the stratigraphy of the entire territory of the USSR, and studying the stratigraphy of important economic regions.
2. Simultaneous study of the constituent sedimentary rocks.
3. Study of tectonic processes and clarification of the connection with geological structure and mineral resources. Study of the history of the geological development of the territory of the USSR as a whole and of individual parts interesting for understanding the basic patterns of the geological process.
4. Providing a deep scientific basis for the methodology of prospecting and exploration of mineral resources based on the study of geological conditions favorable for the concentration of mineralization.

In the early 1950s (in the modern building of GIN RAS), a new structure of the IGN USSR Academy of Sciences was formed.

=== Geological Institute (since 1956) ===
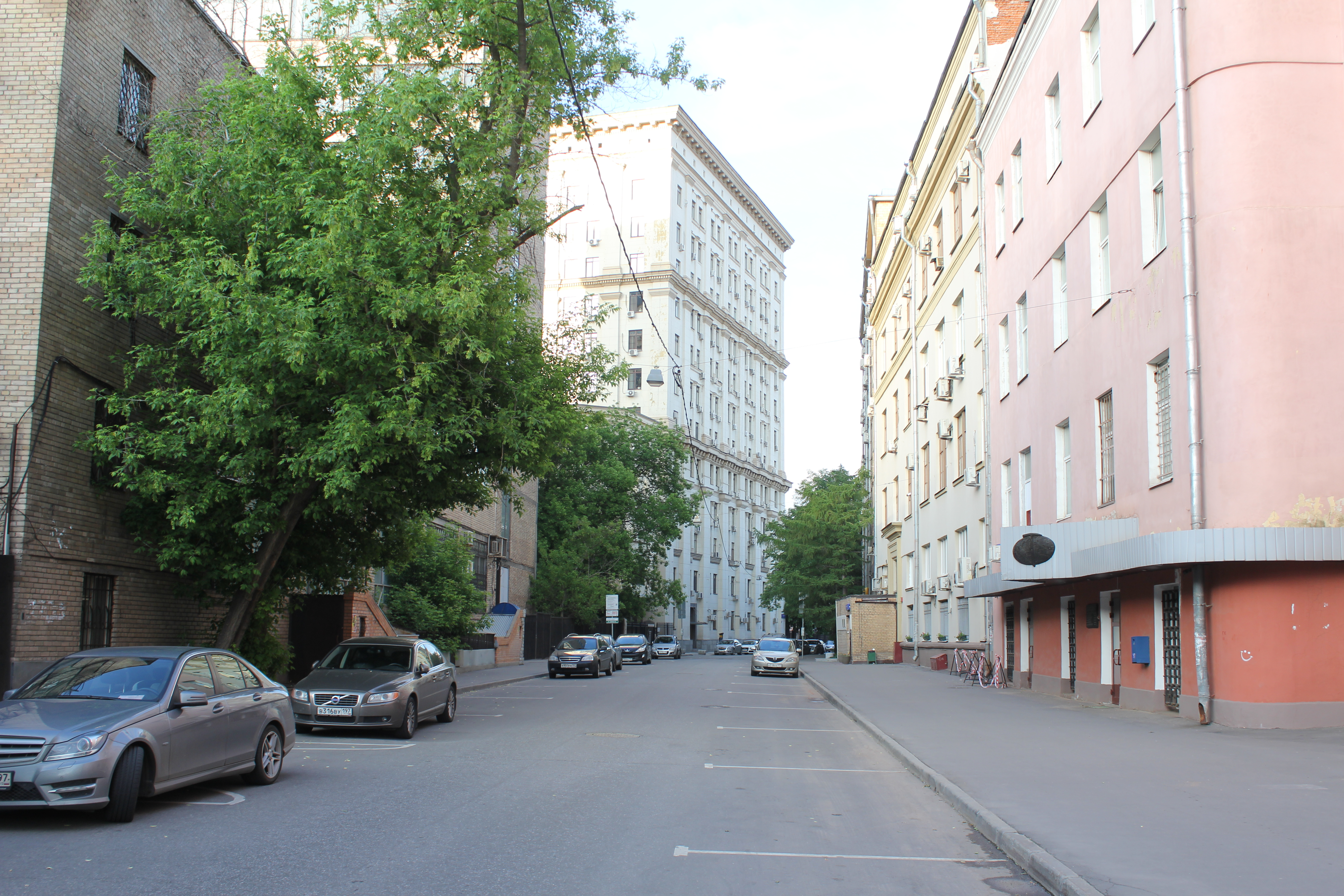
GIN RAS in 2015

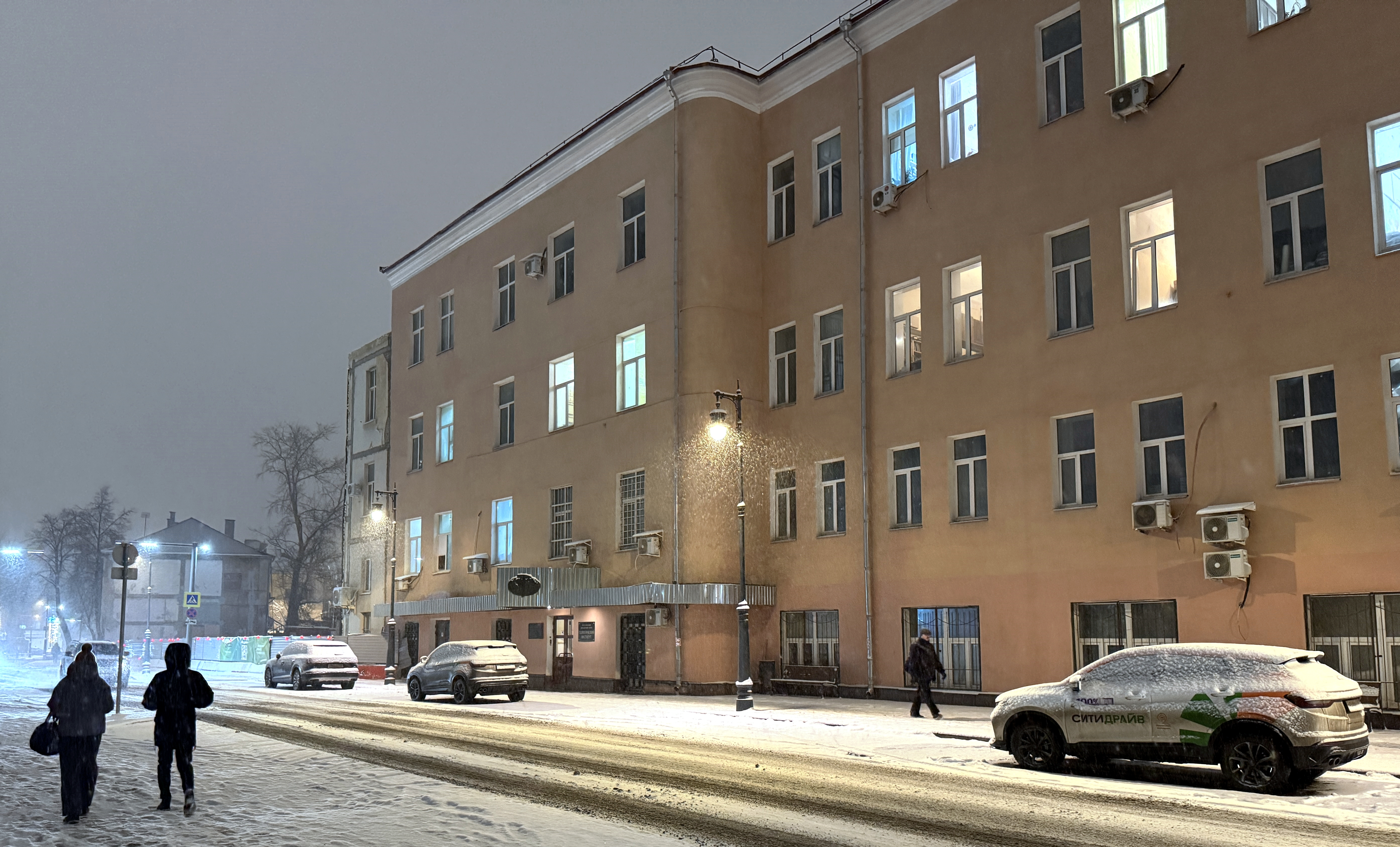
GIN RAS in 2025

On April 27, 1944, the Presidium of the USSR Academy of Sciences recognized the need to reorganize the Institute of Geological Sciences, creating on its basis, within the Department of Geological and Geographical Sciences of the USSR Academy of Sciences:

- Geological Institute
- Institute of Mineralogy and Geochemistry named after M.V. Lomonosov
- Institute of Petrographic Research named after F.Yu. Levinson-Lessing
- Institute of Ore Deposits
- Laboratory of Coal Geology.
- To consider the issue of organizing work on the study of the Precambrian.

In 1946, it was decided to organize the Geological Institute on the basis of several divisions of the IGN USSR Academy of Sciences:

- Department of Stratigraphy
- Department of Tectonics
- Department of Lithology
- Department of Quaternary Geology.

On January 13, 1956, the Presidium of the USSR Academy of Sciences approved the new name and structure of the Geological Institute (GIN USSR Academy of Sciences):

- Directorate
- Academic Council of the Institute
- Department of Stratigraphy (with Microfaunal Laboratory) – Head V. V. Menner.
- Department of Paleofloristics and Stratigraphy of Continental Deposits (with Laboratory for the Study of Proterozoic, Paleozoic, and Mesozoic Spores and Pollen; and Laboratory for the Study of Cenozoic and Quaternary System Spores and Pollen) – Head V. A. Vakhrameev
- Department of Regional Tectonics (with Office of Tectonic Map and Tectonic Terminology) – Head A. L. Yanshin
- Department of General and Comparative Tectonics (with Office for the Study of Geological Formations; and Tectonic-Geophysical Office) – Head N. A. Shtreis
- Department of Lithology and Sedimentary Mineral Resources (with laboratories: Chemical-Analytical, Thermal Analysis, Mineralogical Analysis, Clay Study, Electron Microscopy, X-ray Structural; offices: Bituminology, Lithology of Coal-bearing Deposits and Coal Petrography, Authigenic Mineral Formation) – Head N. M. Strakhov
- Department of Quaternary Formations and Genetic Types of Continental Formations (with Mineralogical-Petrographic Laboratory; and Office for the Study of Genetic Types of Continental Deposits) – Head V. I. Gromov
- Department of Geology of Central and South Asia – Head V. A. Obruchev
- Department of the History of Geology – Head V. V. Tikhomirov.
- Complex Expeditions.

At that time, the new GIN USSR Academy of Sciences employed 252 people, including 127 research staff..

In 1969, the Presidium of the Supreme Soviet of the USSR, "for successes in the development of geological science and the training of highly qualified scientific personnel," by Decree of March 13, 1969, awarded GIN USSR Academy of Sciences the Order of the Red Banner of Labour.

Since the end of November 1991, it has been called the Geological Institute of the Russian Academy of Sciences (GIN RAS).

Since 2004, the Institute of the Lithosphere of the Marginal and Inland Seas RAS has been included in GIN RAS.

The main research areas of the departments of GIN RAS are:

- Tectonics
- Stratigraphy
- Lithology and Geochemistry.

In May 2015, the Department of the History of Geology returned to GIN RAS, reorganized into the Group of the History of Geology.

In May 2019, the relocation of staff from the former building of the Institute of the Lithosphere of the Marginal and Inland Seas RAS was completed.

In March 2020, the Laboratory of Volcanogenic-Sedimentary and Hydrothermal Lithogenesis (Department of Lithology) was reorganized into the Laboratory of Geology and Ore Genesis of the Oceanic Lithosphere (Department of Tectonics).

In December 2020, the 90th anniversary of the institute was celebrated at the Presidium of the RAS.

== Institute Awards ==
- 1969 — Order of the Red Banner of Labour, for successes in the development of geological science and the training of highly qualified scientific personnel.
- 1972 — Jubilee Honorary Badge in commemoration of the 50th anniversary of the formation of the USSR, for achieving the highest results in the All-Union Socialist Competition in commemoration of the Fiftieth Anniversary of the formation of the USSR.
- 1999 – Certificate of Honor to the team of GIN RAS from the Ministry of Science and Technologies of the Russian Federation, for great contribution to the development of national science and on the occasion of the 275th anniversary of the Russian Academy of Sciences.

== Leadership ==
The first director of the Geological Institute of the USSR Academy of Sciences, then located in Leningrad, was Academician V. A. Obruchev, elected to this post on April 3, 1930, at a meeting of the Department of Physical and Mathematical Sciences, and approved in this position by the General Assembly of the USSR Academy of Sciences. At his personal request, on October 20, 1933, the Presidium of the USSR Academy of Sciences relieved V. A. Obruchev of the post of director of the Geological Institute and entrusted the temporary performance of these duties to Academician A. A. Borisyak; his deputy became D. V. Nalivkin, who remained in this post until July 1934, and the scientific secretary of the Institute became I. I. Katushenok.

Immediately after the decree of the Sovnarkom of the USSR on April 25, 1934, on the move of academic institutes to the capital, Academician A. D. Arkhangelsky was elected director, V. N. Mikhnevich was appointed his deputy, and F. A. Makarenko became the scientific secretary.

The Sovnarkom of the USSR on November 17, 1937, decided to reorganize the geological institutions of the USSR Academy of Sciences. In December 1937, the Geological and Petrographic Institutes merged with the Institute of Geochemistry and Mineralogy named after M.V. Lomonosov. As a result, the Institute of Geological Sciences of the USSR Academy of Sciences (IGN) was formed, and A. D. Arkhangelsky was elected its director. His deputies became I. F. Grigoriev, S. A. Kashin, and A. A. Blokhin, who held this position until 1940, and the scientific secretary of the institute was G. A. Mirlin.

In January 1939, A. D. Arkhangelsky, at his personal request due to a sharp deterioration in health, was relieved of the post of director of the IGN USSR Academy of Sciences. He was succeeded by Academician A. N. Zavaritsky, and in 1941, Corresponding Member of the USSR Academy of Sciences I. F. Grigoriev became director.

Directors of GIN and IGN USSR Academy of Sciences (and deputy directors for scientific work), by year of appointment:

- 1930 — Vladimir A. Obruchev from April 3, 1930 (S. A. Gatuev)
- 1933 — Alexei A. Borisyak acting from October 20, 1933 (D. V. Nalivkin)
- 1934 — Andrey D. Arkhangelsky (V. N. Mikhnevich; G. F. Mirchink (1936–1937); from 1937 — I. F. Grigoriev, S. A. Kashin and A. A. Blokhin)

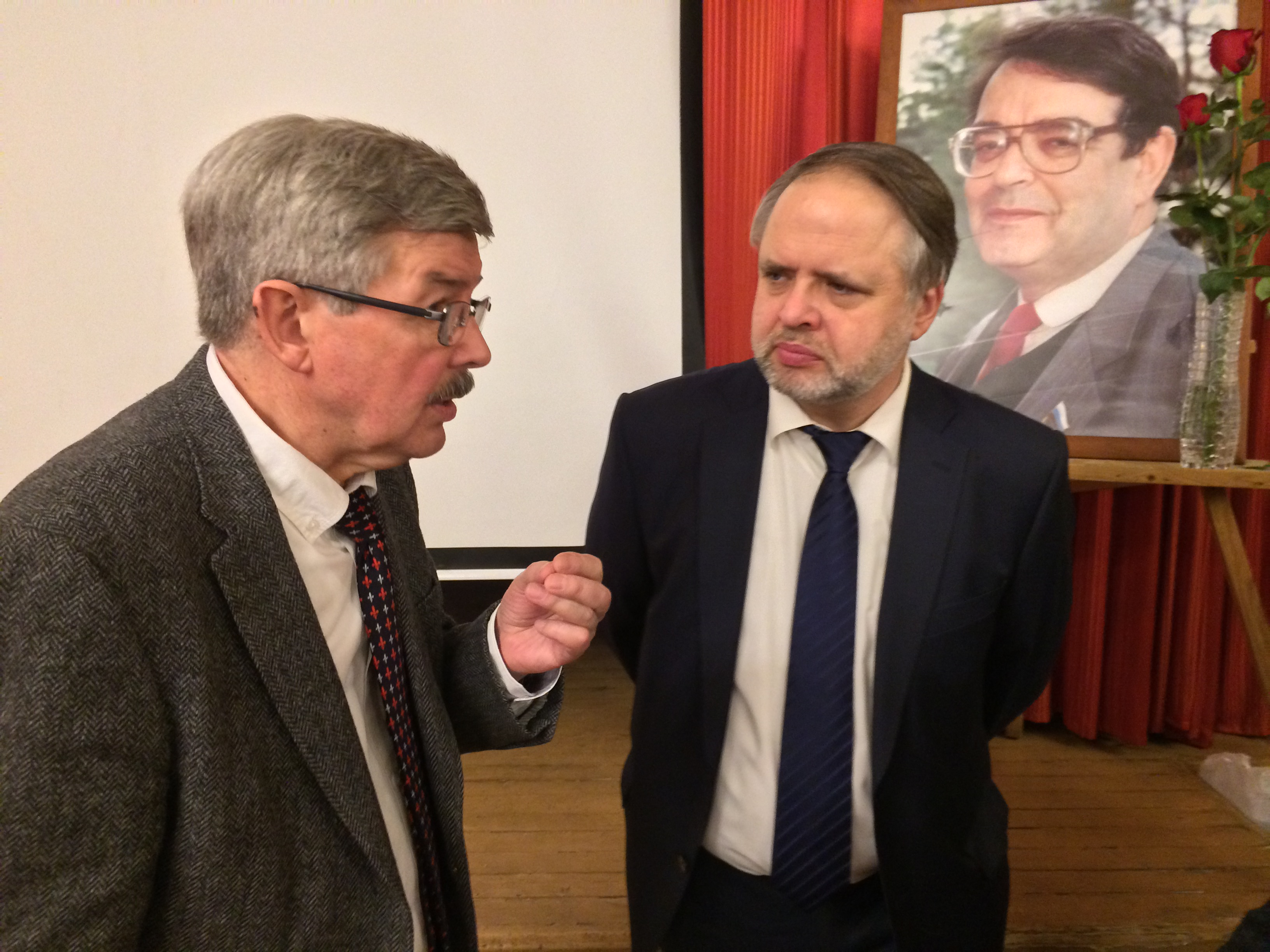
Directors of GIN RAS (M. A. Fedonkin) and IBR RAS (A. V. Vasilyev) at the XVI-th Readings in memory of N. N. Vorontsov, 2017.

- (1938–1956) — see Institute of Geological Sciences of the USSR Academy of Sciences
- 1956 — Nikolai S. Shatsky from January 13, 1956 (A. V. Peive)
- 1961 — Alexander V. Peive from December 1960 (P. P. Timofeev, V. V. Menner, V. A. Krasheninnikov)
- 1986 — Pyotr P. Timofeev from April 1986
- 1989 — Andrey L. Knipper from January 16, 1989
- 1994 — Yury G. Leonov from May 4, 1994
- 2005 — Mikhail G. Leonov from January 1, 2005
- 2009 — Mikhail A. Fedonkin from December 29, 2009 (N. B. Kuznetsov, V. Y. Lavrushin)
- 2018 — Kirill Y. Degtyarev from September 25, 2018 (N. B. Kuznetsov, V. Y. Lavrushin)

Scientific Secretaries of the institute, by year of appointment:

- 1930 — A. F. Zabegaev
- 1933 — E. V. Pavlovsky
- 1933 — Ivan I. Katushenok
- 1934 – F. A. Makarenko
- 1937 — Gilel A. Mirlin
- (1938–1956) — see Institute of Geological Sciences of the USSR Academy of Sciences
- 1956 — Edmund I. Ravsky
- 1961 – M. S. Markov
- 1964 – K. I. Kuznetsova
- 1969 – T. G. Pavlova
- 1972 — Valentina G. Gerbova
- 1997 —
- 20?? — Yury V. Karyakin
- 2017 — Galina N. Alexandrova

== Modern structure ==
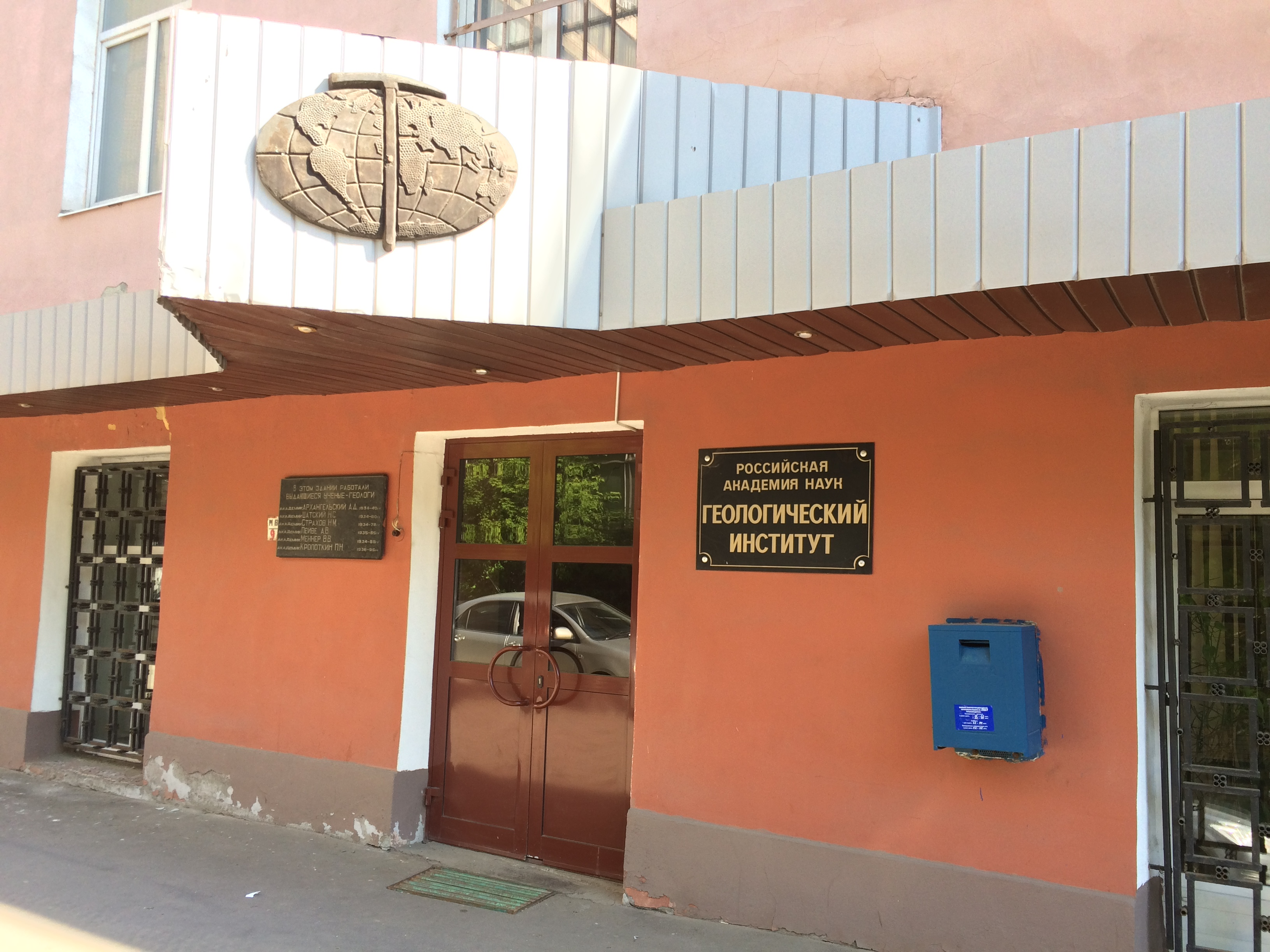
GIN RAS in 2016

The Geological Institute includes:

Department of Tectonics

- Laboratory of Geodynamics of the Late Precambrian and Phanerozoic
- Laboratory of Tectonics of the Consolidated Crust
- Laboratory of Tectonics of Oceans and Peri-Oceanic Zones
- Laboratory of Geomorphology and Tectonics of the Ocean Floor
- Laboratory of Neotectonics and Modern Geodynamics
- Laboratory of Geology of Ophiolites
- Laboratory of Tectonics of the Early Precambrian
- Laboratory of Paleomagnetism
- Laboratory of Comparative Analysis of Sedimentary Basins
- Laboratory of Heat and Mass Transfer
- Laboratory of Geology and Metallogeny of Polar Regions
- Laboratory of Mineralogical and Track Analysis
- Laboratory of Geology and Ore Genesis of the Oceanic Lithosphere.

Department of Stratigraphy

- Laboratory of Stratigraphy of the Upper Precambrian
- Laboratory of Phanerozoic Stratigraphy
- Laboratory of Micropaleontology
- Laboratory of Paleofloristics
- Laboratory of Biostratigraphy
- Laboratory of Quaternary Stratigraphy

Department of Lithology

- Laboratory of Lithogenesis
- Laboratory of Sedimentology and Geochemistry of Sedimentary Basins
- Laboratory of Physical Methods for Studying Rock-Forming Minerals
- Laboratory of Chemical-Analytical Research
- Laboratory of Isotope Geochemistry and Geochronology

As well as:

- Group of the History of Geology
- Group of the Tectonic Map.

=== Members of the RAS ===
Among the staff and members of the Academic Council:

Academicians of the RAS

- Kirill Y. Degtyarev
- Mikhail A. Fedonkin
- Alexander I. Khanchuk

Corresponding Members of the RAS

- Alexei B. Herman
- Alexei N. Didenko
- Nikolai B. Kuznetsov
- Andrey V. Maslov
- Boris G. Pokrovsky
- Sergei D. Sokolov

Professors of the RAS

The honorary title "Professor of the RAS" was awarded to:

- 2015 — Sergei V. Naugolnykh (from December 29, 2015) Department of Earth Sciences RAS.
- 20?? — Alexei V. Soloviev
- 2022 — Mikhail A. Rogov.

== Scientific publications ==
Publications associated with GIN RAS:

- Proceedings of the Geological Institute of the USSR Academy of Sciences and RAS
- Stratigraphy and Geological Correlation
- Geotectonics
- Lithology and Mineral Resources
- Bulletin of the Commission for the Study of the Quaternary Period
- Geological Study of the USSR
- Essays on the History of Geological Knowledge

== Memory ==
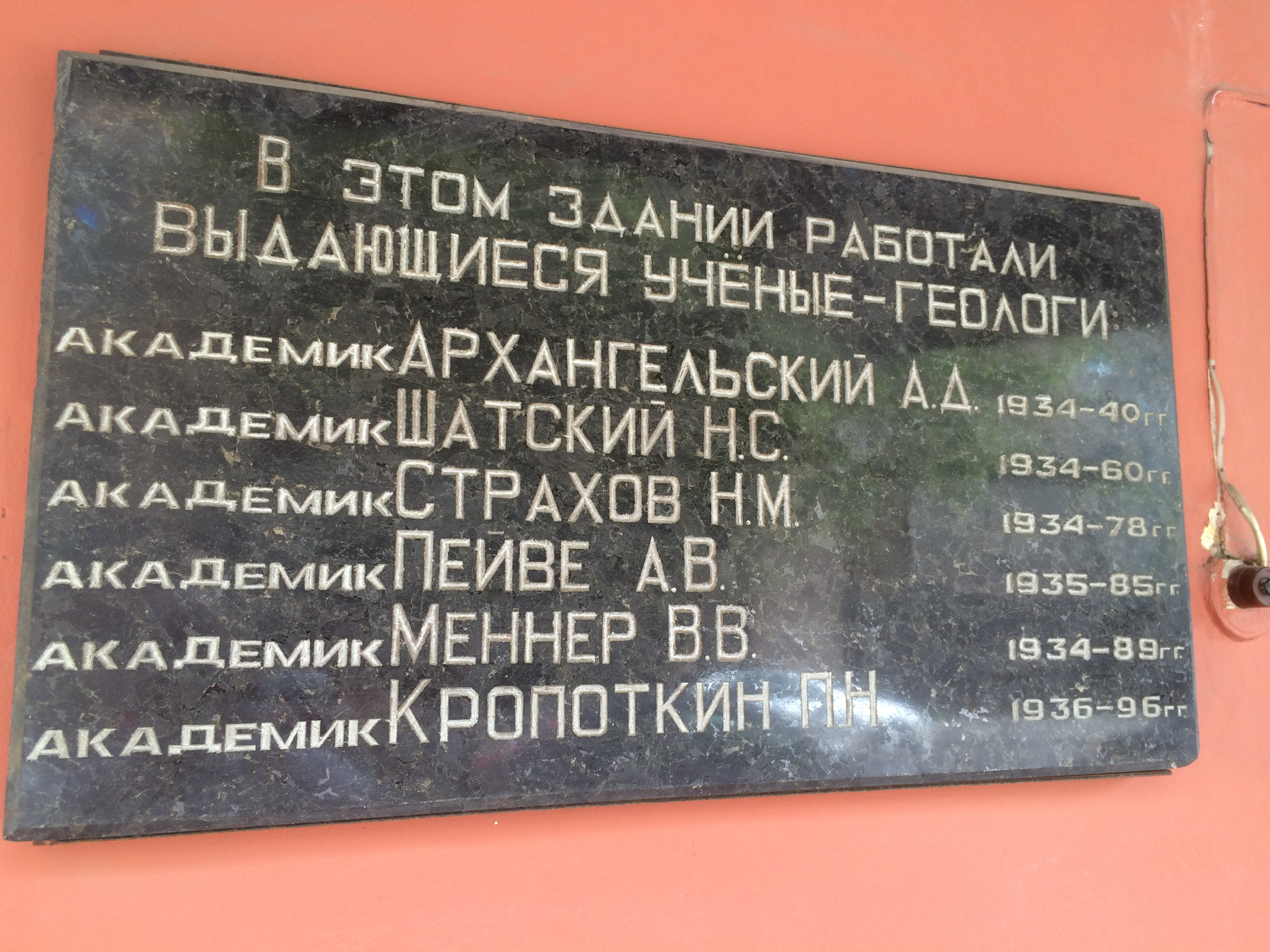
Memorial plaque at GIN RAS, 1999

In 1999, a memorial plaque "In Memory of the Outstanding Geologists of the Geological Institute of the Russian Academy of Sciences" was installed on the facade of the building.

== Literature ==
- Arkhangelsky A. D., Neiburg M. F. Geological Institute // Herald of the USSR Academy of Sciences. 1937. No. 10/11. P. 168–180.
- Tikhomirov V. V., Solovyov Yu. Ya., Panyutina L. B., Gordina I. A., Malakhova I. G., Bugelskaya L. V. History of the Geological Institute of the USSR Academy of Sciences: Development of the institute, its Scientific Schools and Bibliography of Works / ed. by A. V. Peive. M.: Nauka, 1980. 223 p.
- Tikhomirov V. V., Laverov N. P., Solovyov Yu. Ya. To the Geological Institute of the USSR Academy of Sciences – 50 years // Soviet Geology. 1980. No. 9. P. 5–15.
- Pushcharovsky Yu. M. On the 80th Anniversary of the Geological Institute of the RAS: Notes of a Tectonicist // Geotectonics. 2010. No. 3. P. 91–94.

Encyclopedias:

- "ГЕОЛОГИЧЕСКИЙ ИНСТИТУТ • Большая российская энциклопедия – электронная версия". bigenc.ru. Archived from the original on November 26, 2022.
- "Геологический институт (ГИН)". bse.sci-lib.com.
