= DigiMorph =

Digital Morphology (DigiMorph), part of the National Science Foundation Digital Libraries Initiative, creates and shares 2D and 3D visualizations of the internal and external structure of living and extinct vertebrates, and a growing number of 'invertebrates.'

The information core for the DigiMorph library is generated using a high-resolution X-ray computed tomographic (X-ray CT) scanner at the University of Texas at Austin. This instrument is comparable to a conventional medical diagnostic CAT scanner, but with greater resolution and penetrating power. The device uses X-rays to take images of thin slices through solid objects, such as bone and rock. Hundreds to thousands of slices are stacked up to create a three-dimensional model of the object, allowing researchers to peer inside without damaging it.

As of 2007, the DigiMorph library contains over a terabyte of imagery of natural history specimens that are important to education and research efforts. The DigiMorph library site now serves imagery, optimized for Web delivery, for over 475 specimens contributed by more than 125 collaborating researchers from natural history museums and universities worldwide.

The CT scanner is housed at the Jackson School of Geosciences at the University of Texas at Austin and is operated by scientists in The University of Texas High-Resolution X-ray Computed Tomography Facility (UTCT), a designated NSF-supported Multi-User Facility.
