= History of Russia in Photographs =

- Website type: Photo Archive
- Owner: Multimedia Art Museum
- Creator: Yandex Publishing
- Website: https://russiainphoto.ru/
- Commercial: No
- Launched: 2016
- Current status: Active

External image
- Photo collection on the History of Russia in Photographs website

History of Russia in Photographs (since 2016) is the largest virtual photo archive dedicated to the history of Russia, containing over 160 thousand photographs on various topics from museum archives and collections. The photographs were taken in the Russian Empire, the USSR, and Russia from 1853 to 1999 inclusive.

The publishers describe it as "a global publicly accessible photo archive combining state, municipal, and private photo collections." "History of Russia in Photographs" is a photographic chronicle of Russia, uniting photographic collections from museums, archives, and private owners.

== History ==
The resource was launched on June 12, 2016, with the support of the company Yandex on the initiative of the Moscow City Government and the Multimedia Art Museum.

The main sources of images are museum and private collections, as well as photographs held in various Russian organizations.

The website offers registered users the ability to upload images, subject to subsequent moderation.

Since 2019, photographs on the history of science from the collection of the Group of the History of Geology of the Geological Institute RAS have been published on the site.

== Statistics ==
The number of photographs selected for the archive (in thousands of uploaded photographs at the beginning of the year) by year:

- 2017 — 70
- 2018 — 100
- 2019 — 120
- 2020 — 130
- 2021 — 150
- 2022 — 155
- 2023 — 160
- 2024 — 180
- 2025 — 195

== Gallery ==
Examples of historical photographs published in the "History of Russia in Photographs" photo archive (and on Wikimedia Commons):
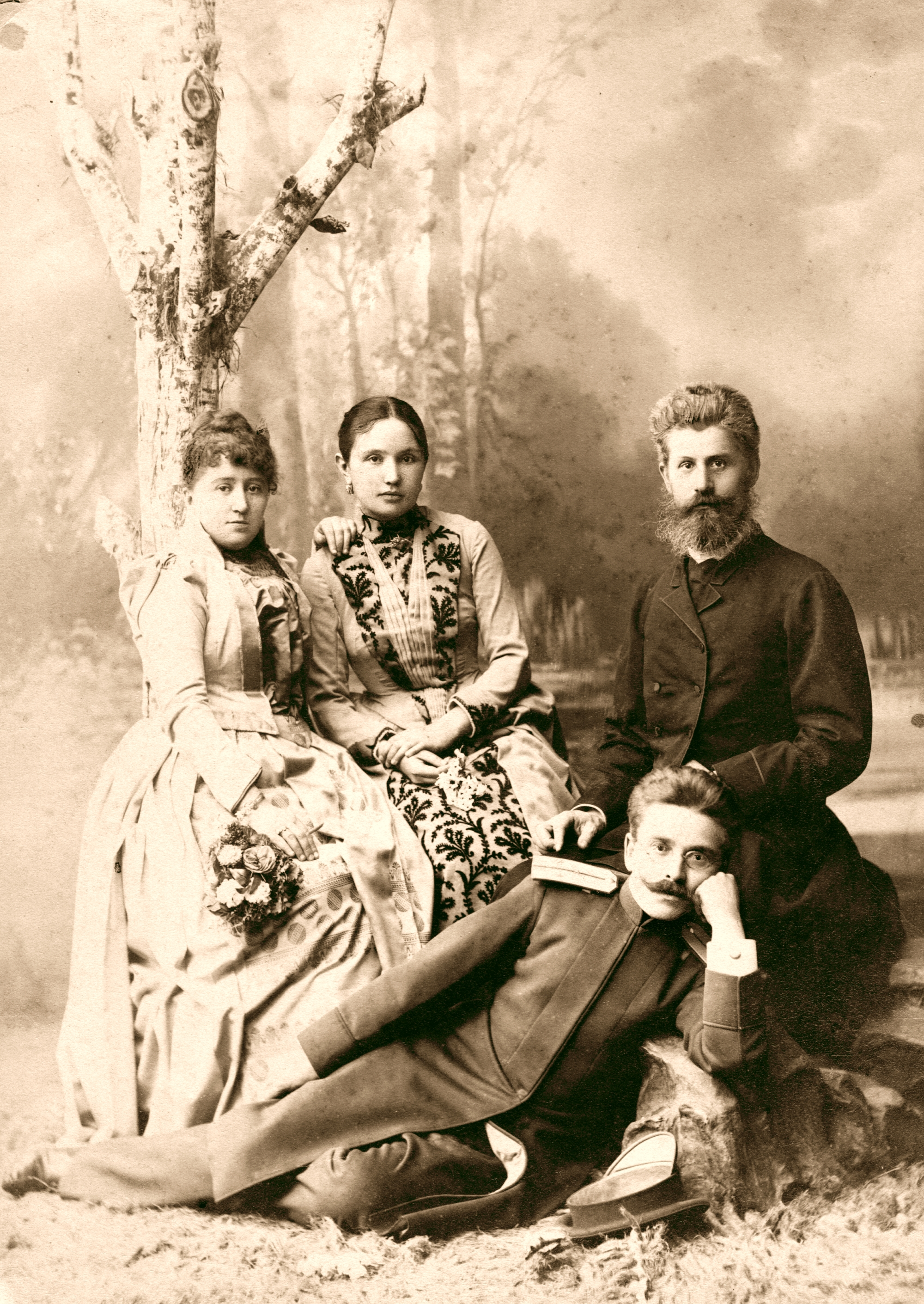
1880s

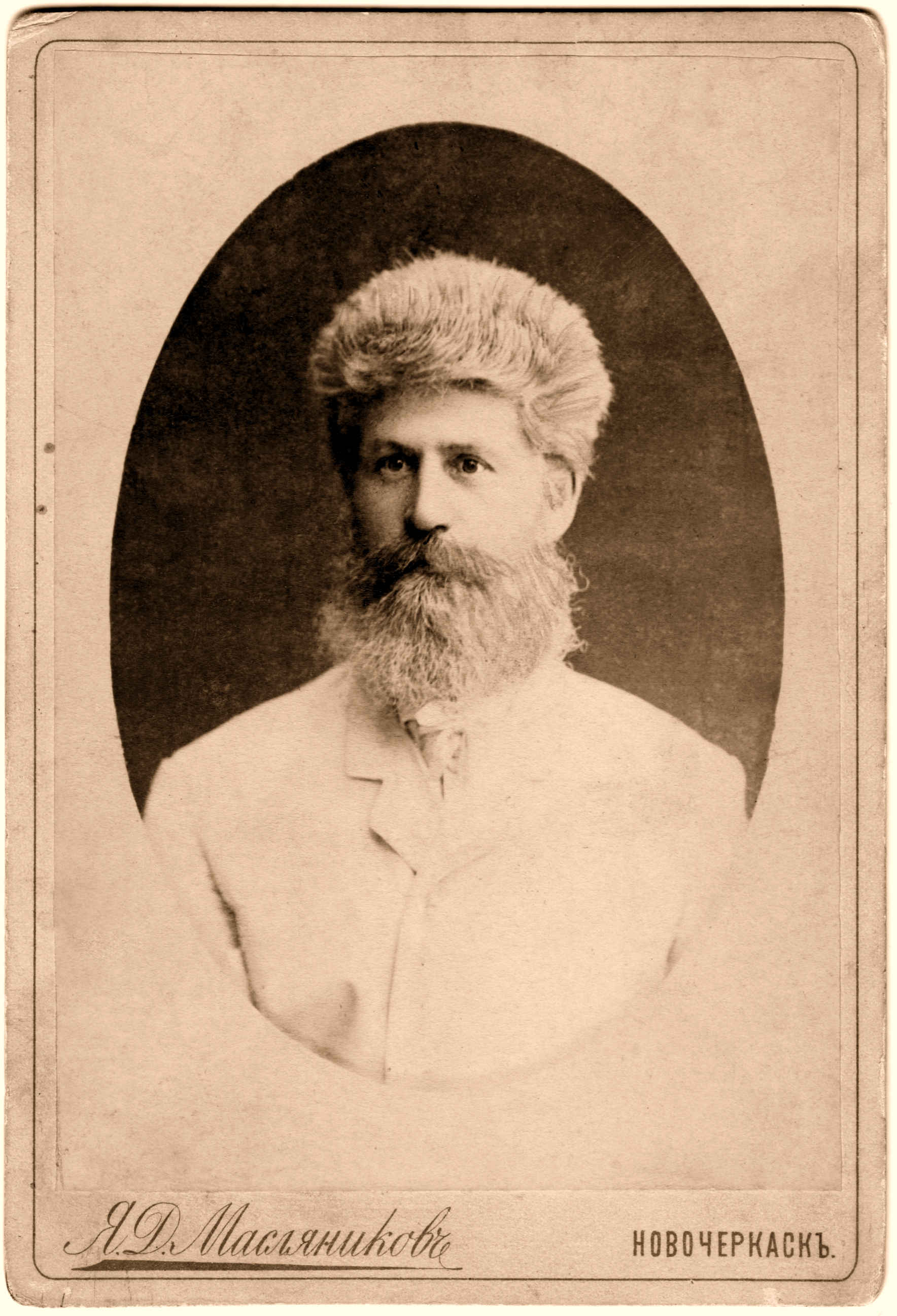
1890s

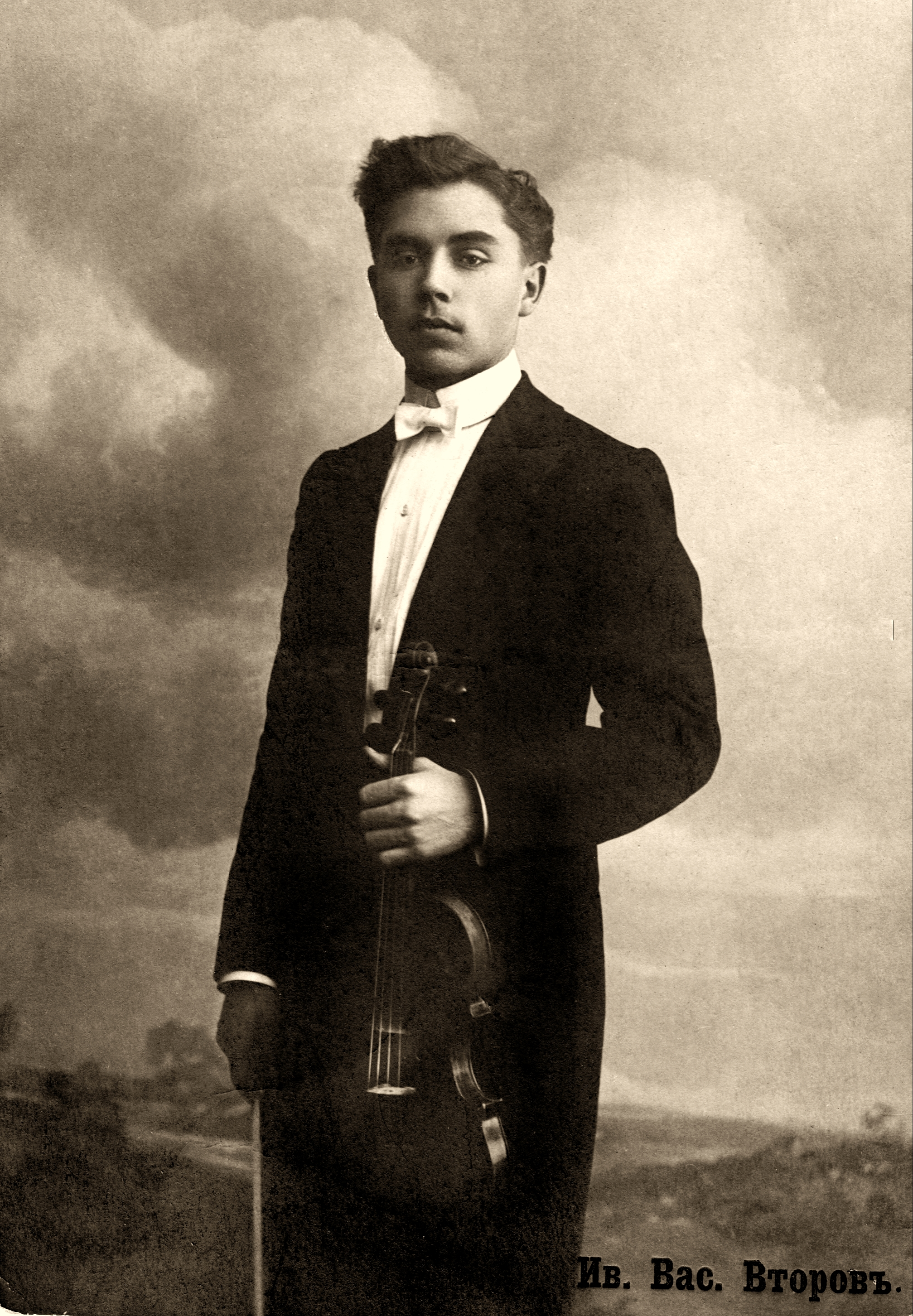
1909

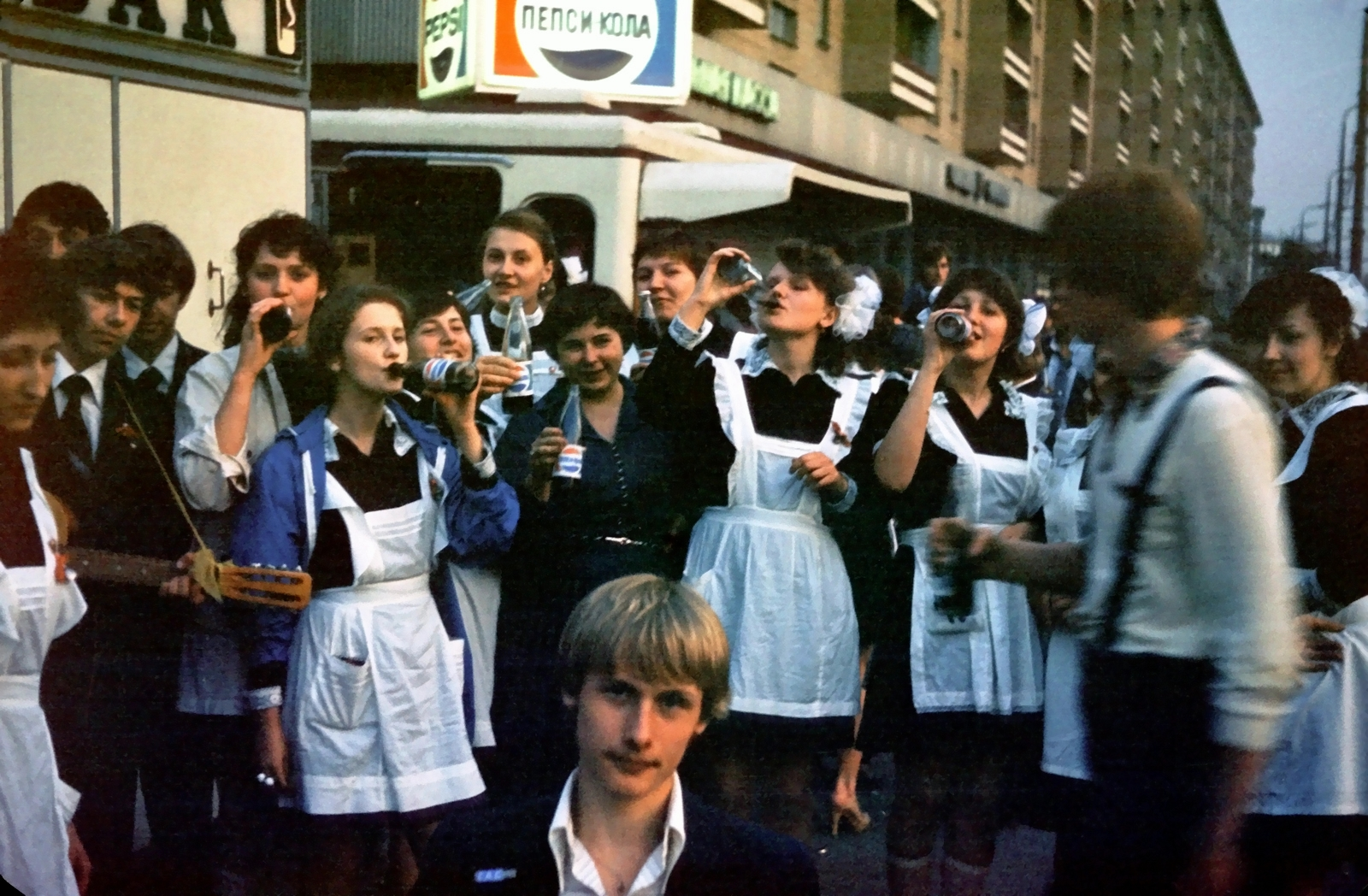
1981

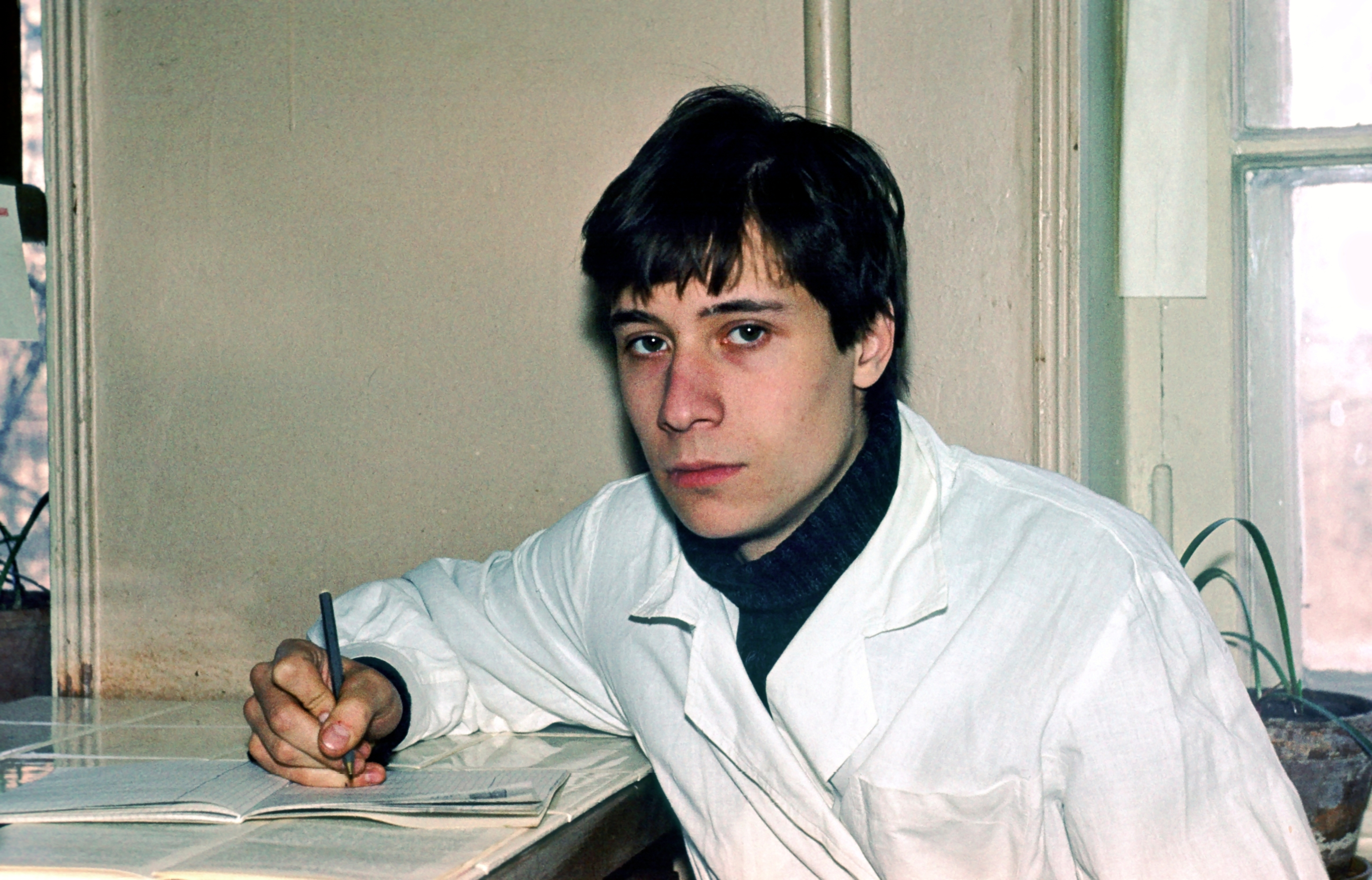
1983

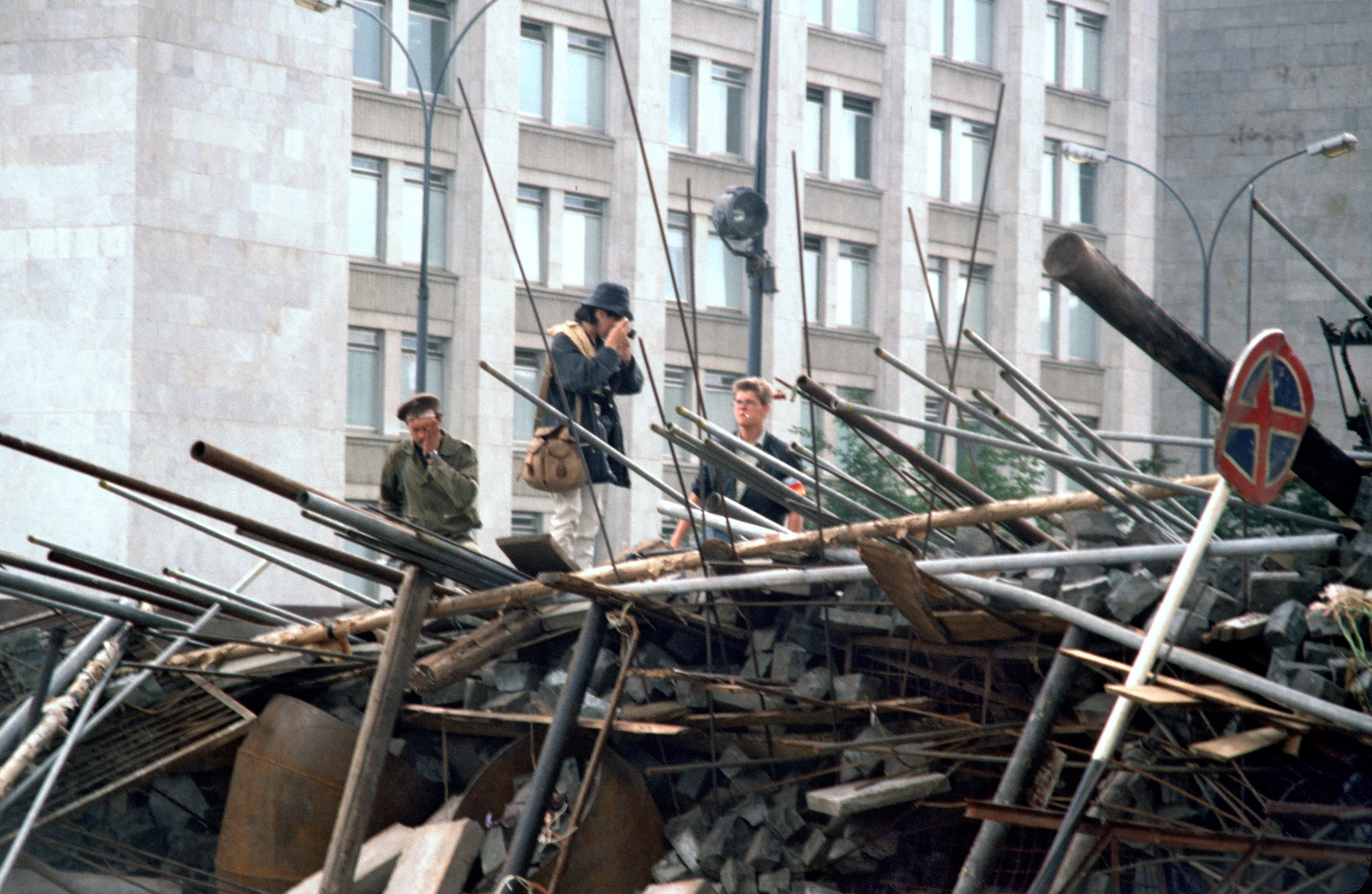
1991
