= Greg Hirth =

American geophysicist

James Gregory "Greg" Hirth (born June 4, 1963) is an American geophysicist, specializing in tectonophysics. He is known for his experiments in rock deformation and his applications of rheology in development of models for tectonophysics.

== Biography ==
Greg Hirth as a boy and teenager enjoyed the outdoors in the woods of Ohio and the mountains of Colorado. He graduated in 1985 with a B.S. in geological sciences from Indiana University. At Brown University, he graduated in geological sciences with a master's degree in 1987 and a Ph.D. in 1991. His Ph.D. thesis was supervised by Jan Tullis. For the academic year 1991–1992, Hirth was a postdoc in the department of geology and geophysics at the University of Minnesota. There his supervisor was David L. Kohlstedt. In the department of geology and geophysics of the Woods Hole Oceanographic Institution (WHOI), Hirth was a postdoc in 1993, an assistant scientist from 1994 to 1998, and an associate scientist from 1998 to 2007 (with tenure from 2001). In the Department of Earth, Environmental and Planetary Sciences of Brown University, he was an associate professor from 2007 to 2009 and was appointed to a full professorship in 2010, which he currently holds. From 2015 to 2020, he chaired his department. He has held visiting positions at Caltech (fall 1999), France's University of Montpellier (spring 2007), and Rice University (spring 2011).

From 1993 to 2007, Hirth was a part-time research affiliate at Massachusetts Institute of Technology (MIT), as a participant in collaborative efforts in geophysics by WHOI and MIT. For the WHOI/MIT Joint Program, he was the leader for field trips in 1994 to Basin and Range National Monument, in 2001 to Yellowstone National Park and Snake River Plain, and in 2003 to Mount St. Helens and Puget Sound.

Hirth has done ophiolite fieldwork in Oman, Josephine County, Oregon, Washington State's Cascade Mountains, the region near Big Jim Mountain in the Chiwaukum Mountains, and Trinity County, California. He has also done geological fieldwork in Central Australia (1993), the Talkeetna Arc (2000–2002), Norway (2009), and California's Mecca Hills (2021). Hirth was on three research cruises to the Southwest Indian Ridge.

From 2013 to 2015, Hirth was the president of the Tectonophysics Section of the American Geophysical Union. From 1997 to 1999, he served on the editorial board of the journal Geology. He was an associate editor from 1999 to 2002 for the Journal of Geophysical Research and from 2006 to 2010 for the journal Geochemistry, Geophysics, Geosystems (colloquially called G-cubed).

Hirth's 1996 paper, Water in the oceanic upper mantle: Implications for rheology, melt extraction and the evolution of the lithosphere, co-authored with David L. Kohlstedt, has been cited more than 1750 times. Hirth is the author or co-author of more than 25 articles that have been cited more than 100 times each. He has done research on earthquakes, effects of melt and creep in the mantle on the rheology of the aggregate, and the effects of grain size evolution on geophysical processes. He and his colleagues have used experimental and theoretical rheology in constructing models of the oceanic lithosphere, the Iceland hotspot, and several other geophysical phenomena.

In 2006, Hirth was elected in a Fellow of the Mineralogical Society of America and in 2008 a Fellow of the American Geophysical Union (AGU). He gave the AGU's Francis Birch Lecture in 2017. He received the George P. Woollard Award from the Geological Society of America (GSA) in 2018.

His father, John Price Hirth, was elected in 1974 a member of the National Academy of Engineering and in 1994 a member of the National Academy of Sciences. Greg Hirth married Ann E. Mulligan, whom he met at Brown University. She graduated in 1988 from Brown University with an A.B. in geological sciences and in 1999 from the University of Connecticut with a Ph.D. in environmental engineering. She is a researcher employed at WHOI's Marine Policy Center.

== Selected publications ==
=== Articles ===
- Hirth, Greg; Tullis, Jan (1989). "The effects of pressure and porosity on the micromechanics of the brittle-ductile transition in quartzite". Journal of Geophysical Research: Solid Earth. 94 (B12): 17825–17838. Bibcode:1989JGR....9417825H. doi:10.1029/JB094iB12p17825.
- Hirth, Greg; Tullis, Jan (1992). "Dislocation creep regimes in quartz aggregates". Journal of Structural Geology. 14 (2): 145–159. Bibcode:1992JSG....14..145H. doi:10.1016/0191-8141(92)90053-Y.
- Escartín, J.; Hirth, G.; Evans, B. (1997). "Nondilatant brittle deformation of serpentinites: Implications for Mohr-Coulomb theory and the strength of faults" (PDF). Journal of Geophysical Research: Solid Earth. 102 (B2): 2897–2913. Bibcode:1997JGR...102.2897E. doi:10.1029/96JB02792.
- Kelemen, P. B.; Hirth, G.; Shimizu, N.; Spiegelman, M.; Dick, H. J. (1997). "A review of melt migration processes in the adiabatically upwelling mantle beneath oceanic spreading ridges". Philosophical Transactions of the Royal Society of London. Series A: Mathematical, Physical and Engineering Sciences. 355 (1723): 283–318. Bibcode:1997RSPTA.355..283K. doi:10.1098/rsta.1997.0010. S2CID 140727722.
- Dunlap, W. J.; Hirth, G.; Teyssier, C. (1997). "Thermomechanical evolution of a ductile duplex". Tectonics. 16 (6): 983–1000. Bibcode:1997Tecto..16..983D. doi:10.1029/97TC00614. S2CID 128513577.
- Hirth, Greg; Teyssier, Christian; Dunlap, James W. (2001). "An evaluation of quartzite flow laws based on comparisons between experimentally and naturally deformed rocks". International Journal of Earth Sciences. 90 (1): 77–87. Bibcode:2001IJEaS..90...77H. doi:10.1007/s005310000152. S2CID 130482805.
- Evans, Rob. L.; Hirth, Greg; Baba, Kiyoshi; Forsyth, Don; Chave, Alan; MacKie, Randall (2005). "Geophysical evidence from the MELT area for compositional controls on oceanic plates". Nature. 437 (7056): 249–252. Bibcode:2005Natur.437..249E. doi:10.1038/nature04014. hdl:1912/387. PMID 16148932. S2CID 4422215.
- Mehl, Luc; Hirth, Greg (2008). "Plagioclase preferred orientation in layered mylonites: Evaluation of flow laws for the lower crust". Journal of Geophysical Research: Solid Earth. 113 (B5) 2007JB005075. Bibcode:2008JGRB..113.5202M. doi:10.1029/2007JB005075. hdl:1721.1/42997. See plagioclase and mylonite; Hirth supervised the Ph.D. thesis of Luc Mehl, who became an author and adventure guide in Alaska.
- Billen, Magali I.; Hirth, Greg (2007). "Rheologic controls on slab dynamics". Geochemistry, Geophysics, Geosystems. 8 (8) 2007GC001597. Bibcode:2007GGG.....8.8012B. doi:10.1029/2007GC001597. hdl:1912/3255. S2CID 53334668.
- Behn, Mark D.; Kelemen, Peter B.; Hirth, Greg; Hacker, Bradley R.; Massonne, Hans-Joachim (2011). "Diapirs as the source of the sediment signature in arc lavas". Nature Geoscience. 4 (9): 641–646. Bibcode:2011NatGe...4..641B. doi:10.1038/ngeo1214. hdl:1912/4826. (See diapir.)
- Kelemen, Peter B.; Hirth, Greg (2012). "Reaction-driven cracking during retrograde metamorphism: Olivine hydration and carbonation". Earth and Planetary Science Letters. 345–348: 81–89. Bibcode:2012E&PSL.345...81K. doi:10.1016/j.epsl.2012.06.018.

=== Books ===
- Handy, Mark R.; Hirth, Greg; Hovius, Niels, eds. (2007). Tectonic Faults: Agents of Change on a Dynamic Earth. MIT Press. ISBN 9780262083621. LCCN 2006033362.
