= Brian K. Horton =

American geologist (born 1970)

- Born: March 23, 1970 (age 56); Los Angeles, California, U.S.
- Education: University of New Mexico, Montana State University, University of Arizona
- Awards: Donath Medal, Alexander von Humboldt Fellow, William R. Dickinson Medal
- Scientific career
- Fields: Geology, Tectonics, Stratigraphy, Sedimentology
- Workplaces: Louisiana State University, University of California, Los Angeles, University of Texas at Austin

Brian K. Horton (born March 23, 1970) is an American geologist, currently the Alexander Deussen Professor of Energy Resources at the Jackson School of Geosciences, University of Texas at Austin. He studies sedimentary geology and tectonics, with emphasis on foreland basins and fold and thrust belts. His research addresses nonmarine depositional systems (including fluvial megafans), sediment provenance, river catchment evolution, and mountain building along convergent plate margins (including the Tibetan Plateau, Zagros Mountains, and North American Cordillera), with a focus on the evolution of the Andes Mountains and Amazon Basin. Horton received the Geological Society of America Donath Medal (Young Scientist Award) in 2004, an Alexander von Humboldt Foundation fellowship in 2005-2006, and the Society for Sedimentary Geology (SEPM) William R. Dickinson Medal in 2018. He is a fellow of the Geological Society of America and the Alexander von Humboldt Foundation.
