= Geotectonics (journal) =

- Discipline: Geology
- Language: English
- Edited by: K. E. Degtyarev

Publication details
- Publisher: Springer Science+Business Media
- Open access: No
- Impact factor: 0.746 (2014)

Standard abbreviations
- ISO 4: Geotectonics

Indexing
- ISSN: 0016-8521 (print); 1556-1976 (web)

Links
- Journal homepage; Online archive

Geotectonics is a peer-reviewed scientific journal published by Springer. The scope of the journal is the tectonics, magmatism, metamorphism, structural geology, mineral resources, geodynamics and the deep structure of the Earth.

The journal is indexed in Science Citation Index Expanded (SciSearch), Journal Citation Reports/Science Edition, SCOPUS, INSPEC, Astrophysics Data System (ADS), Google Scholar, EBSCO, CSA, Academic OneFile, ASFA, Current Contents/Physical, Chemical and Earth Sciences, Gale, Geobase, GeoRef, INIS Atomindex, OCLC, Petroleum Abstracts, ReadCube, SCImago and Summon by ProQuest

== See also ==
- Journal of Petrology
- Journal of Structural Geology
- Tectonophysics
