= Jan Tullis =

American geologist

Julia Ann ("Jan") Tullis
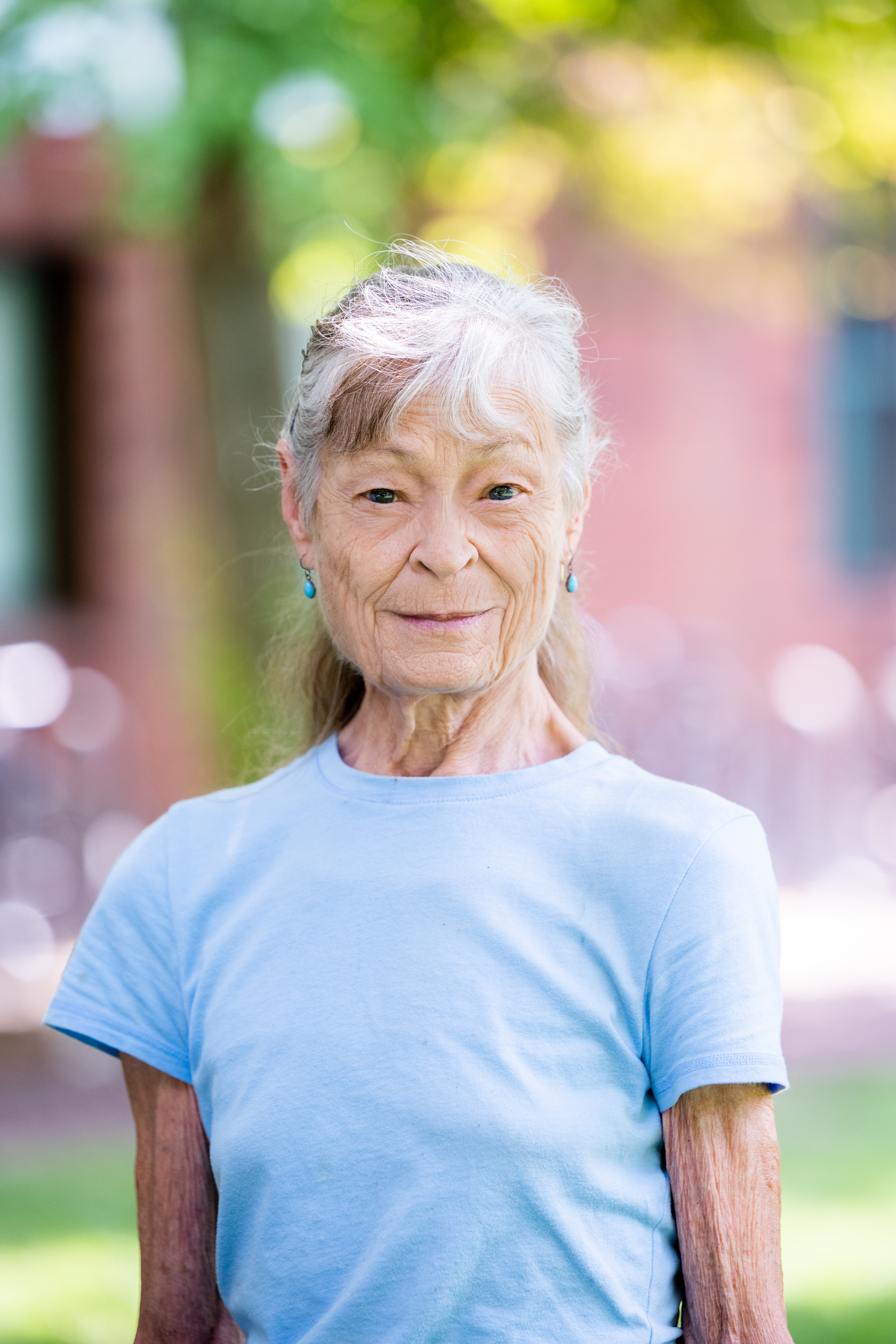
- Born: Julia Ann Tullis; February 21, 1943; Swedesboro, New Jersey, U.S.
- Died: September 15, 2024 (aged 81); Providence, Rhode Island, U.S.
- Education: Carleton College (A.B.) University of California, Los Angeles (PhD)
- Known for: Deformation Mechanics
- Scientific career
- Fields: Geology; Rock mechanics; Rheology
- Workplaces: University of California, Los Angeles; Brown University
- Thesis: Preferred orientations in experimentally deformed quartzites (1971)
- Doctoral advisor: David T. Griggs, John Christie
- Doctoral students: Greg Hirth

Julia Ann “Jan” Tullis was an American structural geologist and emerita Professor at Brown University. Tullis is known for her work in structural geology, especially for her experimental work in deformation mechanisms, microstructures, and rheology of crustal rocks.

== Education and career ==
Tullis graduated Magna Cum Laude with distinction from Carleton College in June 1965, earning her A.B. in Geology. Following this she completed her PhD at the University of California, Los Angeles in 1971 with a thesis on experimental rock deformation. Tullis became a research assistant at Brown University while editing her dissertation in 1970. Later, Tullis was named a Research Assistant Professor in 1971, Associate Professor in 1979, and a full Professor in 1989. She transitioned to Professor Emerita in 2013 but continued with undergraduate teaching and advising right up to her death in September 2024.

== Research ==
Tullis' research involved experimental investigations of the deformation mechanisms, microstructures and rheology of crustal rocks using constant strain-rate Griggs-type solid medium apparatus including adaptations for molten salt assemblies. Her two major goals were to enable more accurate inferences concerning the thermomechanical history of naturally deformed rocks based on their preserved microstructures and crystallographic preferred orientations, and to provide mechanical data and flow laws to enable more accurate modeling of crustal deformation under various conditions.

Experiments were conducted on monophase and polyphase aggregates, both natural and synthetic, over a wide range of pressure and temperature conditions equivalent to those from the shallow to the deep crust, and involving varying controlled water contents. She and her students and other collaborators documented grain-scale Deformation mechanisms from brittle fracturing to cataclastic flow to dislocation creep and melt or fluid-enhanced diffusion creep. These experiments investigated the role of phase distribution and contiguity in the progressive deformation of polyphase aggregates, and documented a number of processes resulting in strain weakening and localization, such as in mylonite zones. Tullis' work with Renee Heilbronner examined fabric evolution during progressive shearing and static annealing.

=== Selected publications ===
- Microstructures and preferred orientations of experimentally deformed quartzite: Tullis, Christie, and Griggs (1973)
- Experimental deformation of dry westerly granite: Tullis and Yund (1977)
- Hydrolytic weakening of experimentally deformed westerly granite and Hale albite rock: Tullis and Yund (1980)
- Significance and petrogenesis of mylonitic rocks: Tullis, Snoke, and Todd (1982)
- Flow strengths of quartz aggregates: grain size and pressure effects due to hydrolytic weakening: Kronenberg and Tullis (1984)
- Dynamic recrystallization of feldspar: a mechanism for ductile shear zone formation: Tullis and Yund (1985)
- Ductile shear zone from brittle precursors in feldspathic rocks: the role of dynamic recrystallization: Tullis, Dell Angelo, and Tund (1990)
- Dislocation creep regimes in quartz aggregates: Hirth and Tullis (1992)
- Chapter 4 The Brittle-Ductile transition in feldspar aggregates: an experimental study: Tullis and Yund (1992)
- A flow law for dislocation creep of quartz aggregates determined with the molten salt cell: Gleason and Tullis (1995)
- Deformation-enhanced fluid distribution in feldspar aggregates and implications for ductile shear zones: Tullis, Yund, and Farver (1996)
- Textural and mechanical evolution with progressive strain in experimentally deformed aplite: Dell Angelo and Tullis (1996)
- A recrystallized grain size piezometer for experimentally deformed feldspar aggregates: Post and Tullis (1999)
- Weakening and strain localization produced by syn-deformational reaction of plagioclase: Stunitz and Tullis(2001)
- The effect of static annealing on microstructures and crystallography preferred orientations of quartzites experimentally deformed in axial compression and shear: Heilbronner and Tullis (2002)
- Reaction-induced weakening of plagioclase-olivine composites: DeRonde, Stunitz, and Tullis (2005)
- Dauphiné twinning as evidence for an impact origin of preferred orientation in quartzite: An example from Vredefort, South Africa: Holyoke and Tullis (2005)
- Effect of water on the dislocation creep microstructure and flow stress of quartz and implications for the recrystallized grain size piezometer: Stipp and Tullis (2006)
- Mechanisms of weak phase interconnection and the effects of phase strength contrast on fabric development: Holyoke and Tullis (2006)
- Evolution of c axis pole figures and grain size during dynamic recrystallization: Results from experimentally sheared quartzite: Heilbronner and Tullis (2006)
- Effect of aqueous and carbonic fluids on the dislocation creep strength of quartz: Chernak, Hirth, Selverstone, and Tullis (2009)

== Awards and honors ==
- Fellow, Mineralogical Society of America (1985)
- Fellow, Geological Society of America (1995)
- Phil Bray Award for Teaching Excellences in Physical Sciences (1995)
- Fellow, American Geophysical Union (1996)
- Association for Women Geoscientists Outstanding Educator Award (1998)
- Harriet W. Sheridan Award for Distinguished Contribution to Teaching and Learning (2000)
- Karen Romer Award for Undergraduate Advising and Mentoring (2004)
- Structural Geology & Tectonics Career Contribution Award (2005)
