= Claude Jaupart =

French geophysicist

Claude Jaupart (born 22 May 1953) is a French geophysicist and a member of the French Academy of Sciences (since December 2008).

== Biography ==
Professor of geophysics at the University of Paris-Diderot, and a researcher in physical volcanology, he is one of the world's leading specialists in natural hazards of geological origin. He was appointed a member of the Institute, French Academy of Sciences, Section of Universe Sciences. By a presidential decree of 12 January 2011, he succeeded Vincent Courtillot as head of the Institute of Earth Physics in Paris.

Claude Jaupart's work focuses on the thermal structure of continents, the characteristics of the internal movements of our planet responsible for continental drift and the modalities of volcanic eruptions.

== Prizes and awards ==
=== Prizes ===
- 1993: Wager Medal from the International Association of Volcanology and Chemistry of the Earth's Interior (IAVCEI)
- 1995: Silver medal from the CNRS, Fernand Holweck Prize from the French Academy of Sciences.
- 1998: Winner of the Mergier-Bourdeix Prize of the French Academy of Sciences, Fellow of the American Geophysical Union.
- 1999: Prestwich Medal from the Geological Society of London.
- 2007: Holmes Medal of the European Geophysical Union.
- 2008: Member of the French Academy of Sciences.
- 2010: Member of the Academia europaea.
- 2015: Harry H. Hess Medal from the American Geophysical Union (AGU).
- 2025: Foreign Member of the Royal Society

=== Distinctions ===
- CIRES Distinguished Lecturer, Univ. Colorado, 2003.
- Daly Lecture, VGP Section, American Geophysical Union, 2003.
- Ketin Lecture, Istanbul Technical University, 2004.
- Birch Lecture, Tectonophysics Section, American Geophysical Union, 2006.
- Virgil and Mildred Barnes Distinguished Lecturer, Univ. Texas at Austin, 2011.
- Bentor Lecture, Univ. Jerusalem, 2017.
- Vernadsky readings, Moscow, 2018.

=== Serving the community ===
- Fellows Committee, American Geophysical Union, 2010–2012.
- Hess Medal Committee (President), American Geophysical Union, 2002–2003.
- Hess Medal Committee, American Geophysical Union, 2000–2001.
- VGP Fellows Committee, American Geophysical union, 2014–2016.
- VGP Fellows Committee, American Geophysical Union, 2004–2008.
- VGP Fellows Committee, American Geophysical Union, 1998–2000.
- Science Advisory Board, Centre National de la Recherche Scientifique, France 1996–2000.
- Executive Committee, Deep Carbon Observatory, Global Community International Program,
- Sloan Foundation and Carnegie Institution of Washington, 2009–2018.
- Scientific Committee, IFCPAR (Indo-French Centre for the Promotion of Advanced Research) 2015–2019.
- Organizer and Lecturer, Advanced School on Scaling Laws in Geophysics:
- Mechanical and Thermal Processes in Geodynamics,
- The Abdus Salam International Centre for Theoretical Physics, 23 May – 3 June 2011.
- Reading, CIDER Cooperative Institute, University of California, Berkeley, July 2013.
- Lecturer, Advanced School on Physics of Volcanoes, The Abdus Salam International Centre for Theoretical Physics, 17 – 21 October 2016.
- Fellow, American Geophysical Union.
- Fellow, European Geosciences Union.

== Scientific work ==
=== Six main themes. ===
(1) Measurements of surface heat flux, calculation of the Earth's heat balance and its secular cooling rate.

(2) Structure and thermal evolution of the crust and continental roots. Determination of the heat flux at the base of a continental root. Causes of the distribution in time and space of granitic massifs in a province. Mechanisms for stabilizing the continental crust. Consequences of the unstable nature of continental roots.

(3) Convection in the Earth's mantle. How the movements and distribution of temperatures within the Earth are affected by the large variations in viscosity that prevail there and by the presence of continents.

(4) Ascension of magmas and placement of magmatic reservoirs in the continental crust: at what depth and how magmatic reservoirs are formed, role played by the construction of a volcanic building on the surface.

(5) Crystallization and differentiation of magmas: convective exchanges between the layers where crystallization occurs and the interior of a reservoir, competition between sedimentation/flotation of crystals and movements of the carrier magma.

(6) Physics of volcanic eruptions: importance of gas leaks through the walls of a conduit, importance of coupling between flow at the surface and in an eruptive conduit, effects of compressibility on lava flows, effects of fragmentation and fragment size distribution (pumice and ash) on the behaviour of eruptive plumes in the atmosphere.

=== Some publications ===
- Brandeis, G. & Jaupart, C., The kinetics of nucleation and crystal growth and scaling laws for magmatic crystallization, Contrib. Mineral. Petrol. 96, 24-34, 1987
- Pinet C. & Jaupart, C., A thermal model for the distribution in space and time of the Himalayan granites, Earth Planet. Sci Lett. 84, 87-99, 1987
- Jaupart, C. & Vergniolle, S., The generation and collapse of a foam layer at the roof of a basaltic magma chamber, J. Fluid Mech. 203, 347-380, 1989.
- Jaupart C. and C.J. Allegre, Eruption rate, gas content and instabilities of eruption regime in silicic volcanoes, Earth Planet. Sci. Lett. 102, 413-429, 1991
- Davaille, A. and C. Jaupart, Transient high Rayleigh number thermal convection with large viscosity variations, J. Fluid Mech. 253, 141-166, 1993.
- Jaupart, C., and S. Tait, The dynamics of differentiation in magma chambers, J. Geophys. Res. 100, 17615-17636, 1995.
- Guillou, L., and C. Jaupart, On the effect of continents on mantle convection, J. Geophys. Res., 100, 24217-24238, 1995.
- Kaminski, E. and C. Jaupart, The size distribution of pyroclasts and the fragmentation sequence in explosive volcanic eruptions, J. Geophys. Res. 103, 29,759-29,779, 1998
- Pinel, V., and C. Jaupart, The effect of edifice load on magma ascent beneath a volcano, Phil. Trans. R. Soc. Lond. A, 358, 1515–1532, 2000.
- Milelli, L., L. Fourel and C. Jaupart, A lithospheric instability origin for the Cameroon Volcanic Line, Earth Planet. Sci. Lett., 335–336, 80–87, doi.org/10.1016/j.epsl.2012.04.028, 2012.
- Jaupart, C. and J.-C. Mareschal, Post-orogenic thermal evolution of newborn Archean continents, Earth Planet. Sci. Lett. 432, 36-45, doi:10.1016/j.epsl.2015.09.047, 2015. Jaupart, C., S. Labrosse, F. Lucazeau and J.-C. Mareschal, Temperatures, Heat and Energy in the Mantle of the Earth. In: Gerald Schubert (Editor-in-chief), Treatise on Geophysics, 2nd edition, Vol.7, Oxford: Elsevier; p. 223-270, 2015.

== Bibliography ==
- On the mechanisms of heat transfer in the Earth: conduction and convection, Doctoral thesis, University of Paris Diderot – Paris VII, 1982.
- De l'Existence de couches stagnantes à la base des chambres magmatiques convectives, with Geneviève Brandeis and Claude Allègre, Paris, CNRS: Institut national d'astronomie et de géophysique, series "Bulletin PIRPSEV", 1984.
- Les volcans, Paris, Flammarion, coll. "Dominos", 1998.
- La physique et la Terre, chapter: Physique des éruptions volcaniques, Ed. Belin - CNRS Editions, pp. 14–33, 2000.
- Volcans (sound recording-Audio CD), Paris, De vive voix, "sciences à écouter" series, 2001.
- Volcanism: cause of death and source of life, chapter: Why and how volcanoes are formed, under the direction of Patrick de Wever, with Michel Guiraud, Jean-Christophe Komorowski... Paris, Vuibert: Muséum national d'histoire naturelle, pp. 13–26, 2003.
- Au-dessous des volcans, lecture given at the CNAM in 2000 as part of the "366 conferences for the year 2000" operation, VHS cassette from the "Université de tous les savoirs" series, Vanves, Service du film de recherche scientifique, France 5, 2004.
- Heat generation and transport in the Earth, with Jean-Claude Mareschal, Cambridge, Cambridge, Cambridge university press, 2011.
- 5 young researchers of the future, presented by their elders, Paris, Éd. le Pommier, coll. "Promesses de la science le Pommier ! », 2013.
