= Anne Davaille =

French geophysicist

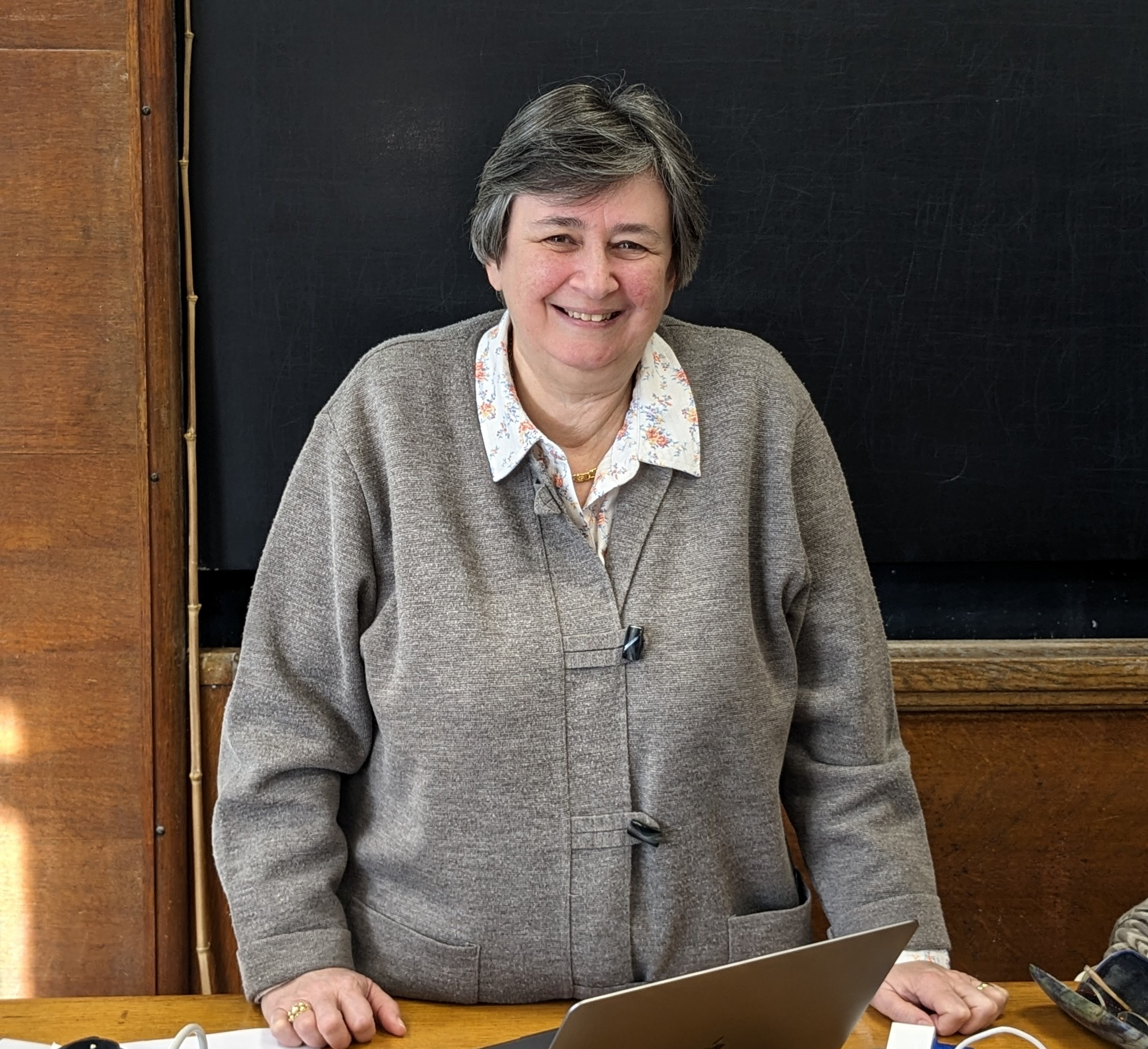
- Anne Davaille at ENS in February 2024
- Education: ESPCI 1988, University of Paris VI, IPGP
- Occupation: Geophysicist
- Employer(s): Université Paris-Sud (Director of research, FAST laboratory)
- Known for: Innovative experiments using thermochemical convection in fluids to simulate the mantles of planet
- Notable work: Worked on physics of mantle plumes
- Awards: 2019 Augustus Love medal of the European Geosciences Union

Anne Davaille is a French geophysicist and director of research at the CNRS, France in the field of Earth Sciences. Her research focuses on Fluid Mechanics and planetary dynamics.

== Education and career ==
Anne Davaille states that her interest in Earth Science was sparked in her childhood by the project FAMOUS scientific exploration. Davaille graduated from ESPCI in 1988. She defended her PhD thesis, Thermal convection in a variable viscosity fluid. Applications to the Earth in 1991, under the supervision of Claude Jaupart at University Paris VI and IPGP.

Davaille is a director of research at the FAST laboratory (Fluides, Automatique et Systèmes Thermiques) of the Université Paris-Sud. Her work focuses on the understanding of fluid mechanics in the mantle of planets, with an emphasis on laboratory experimentation. She has worked extensively on the physics of mantle plumes on Earth as well as on other rocky planets.

== Awards and honors ==
Davaille is the recipient of the 2019 Augustus Love medal of the European Geosciences Union for her innovative experiments and analysis of fluid mechanics to understand convective regimes in the mantle and magmatic systems of the Earth and other planets.
