= Donald W. Forsyth =

American geophysicist and seismologist

Donald "Don" William Forsyth (born January 8, 1948) is an American geophysicist and seismologist, known for his research on the oceanic lithosphere and the oceanic aesthenosphere.

== Biography ==
Forsyth graduated in 1969 with a bachelor's degree in physics from Grinnell College and in 1974 with a Ph.D. in geophysics from the Massachusetts Institute of Technology and Woods Hole Oceanographic Institution. His doctoral dissertation Anisotropy and the structural evolution of the oceanic upper mantle was supervised by Frank Press. Forsyth's first research cruise was aboard the Research Vessel Chain out of Woods Hole. As a postdoctoral researcher, Forsyth worked at the Lamont-Doherty Geological Observatory from 1974 to 1976. In the department of geological sciences at Brown University, he was from 1977 to 1981 an assistant professor, from 1981 to 1988, and a full professor from 1988 until his retirement as professor emeritus. In 1995 he was appointed James L. Manning Professor and is now James L. Manning Professor Emeritus. From 1993 to 1999 he chaired his department.

Forsyth does research on seafloor spreading at mid-ocean ridges, marine geophysics of the lithosphere and asthenosphere, and small-scale convection beneath tectonic plates. He was the leader of the MELT (Mantle Electromagnetic and Tomography) experiment, which deployed a network of seismometers on the seabed. The MELT experiment was a pioneering effort in marine seismology and measured the structure, in terms of S wave velocities, of geologically young crust and mantle involved in seafloor spreading. The MELT experiment revolutionized scientific understanding of the melting processes under the seafloor spreading centers. The experiment showed that such melting extends to a depth of at least 150 kilometers and the melting is asymmetric under the ocean ridge axis. Measurements of phase velocities of Rayleigh waves and Love waves are essential in much of Forsyth's research. Forsyth also led the Gravity Lineations, Intraplate Melting, Petrology and Seismology Expedition (GLIMPSE), which used shipboard gravity measurements to investigate a series of intraplate volcanic ridges in the South Pacific. The GLIMPSE findings contradicted previous hypotheses concerning the origin of the volcanic ridges and led to a new model for the origin of the ridges.

In the introduction to his doctoral dissertation, he thanked his first wife Doris. They have two sons, Matthew (born 1976) and Phillip (born 1978). As of 2017 he was married to Roberta Ryan.

== Awards and honors ==
- 1977 Sloan Research Fellow
- 1982 James B. Macelwane Medal of the American Geophysical Union
- 1988 Guggenheim Fellowship
- 1997 Francis Birch Lectureship of the American Geophysical Union
- 2006 elected a Member of the National Academy of Sciences
- 2010 elected a Fellow of the American Academy of Arts and Sciences
- 2015 Arthur L. Day Medal of the Geological Society of America
- 2017 Maurice Ewing Medal of the American Geophysical Union

== Selected publications ==
- Forsyth, D.; Uyeda, S. (1975). "On the Relative Importance of the Driving Forces of Plate Motion". Geophysical Journal International. 43 (1): 163–200. Bibcode:1975GeoJ...43..163F. doi:10.1111/j.1365-246X.1975.tb00631.x.
- Forsyth, D. W. (1975). "The Early Structural Evolution and Anisotropy of the Oceanic Upper Mantle". Geophysical Journal International. 43 (1): 103–162. Bibcode:1975GeoJ...43..103F. doi:10.1111/j.1365-246X.1975.tb00630.x.
- Forsyth, Donald W. (1977). "The evolution of the upper mantle beneath mid-ocean ridges". Tectonophysics. 38 (1–2): 89–118. Bibcode:1977Tectp..38...89F. doi:10.1016/0040-1951(77)90202-5.
- Gephart, John W.; Forsyth, Donald W. (1984). "An improved method for determining the regional stress tensor using earthquake focal mechanism data: Application to the San Fernando Earthquake Sequence". Journal of Geophysical Research: Solid Earth. 89 (B11): 9305–9320. Bibcode:1984JGR....89.9305G. doi:10.1029/JB089iB11p09305.
- Forsyth, Donald W. (1985). "Subsurface loading and estimates of the flexural rigidity of continental lithosphere". Journal of Geophysical Research: Solid Earth. 90: 12623–12632. Bibcode:1985JGR....9012623F. doi:10.1029/jb090ib14p12623.
- Morgan, Jason Phipps; Forsyth, Donald W. (1988). "Three-dimensional flow and temperature perturbations due to a transform offset: Effects on oceanic crustal and upper mantle structure". Journal of Geophysical Research: Solid Earth. 93 (B4): 2955–2966. Bibcode:1988JGR....93.2955M. doi:10.1029/JB093iB04p02955.
- Ebinger, C. J.; Bechtel, T. D.; Forsyth, D. W.; Bowin, C. O. (1989). "Effective elastic plate thickness beneath the East African and Afar plateaus and dynamic compensation of the uplifts". Journal of Geophysical Research: Solid Earth. 94: 2883–2901. Bibcode:1989JGR....94.2883E. doi:10.1029/jb094ib03p02883.
- Bechtel, Timothy D.; Forsyth, Donald W.; Sharpton, Virgil L.; Grieve, Richard A. F. (1990). "Variations in effective elastic thickness of the North American lithosphere". Nature. 343 (6259): 636–638. Bibcode:1990Natur.343..636B. doi:10.1038/343636a0. S2CID 4315370.
- Shen, Yang; Forsyth, Donald W. (1995). "Geochemical constraints on initial and final depths of melting beneath mid-ocean ridges". Journal of Geophysical Research: Solid Earth. 100 (B2): 2211–2237. Bibcode:1995JGR...100.2211S. doi:10.1029/94JB02768.
- Tompkins, S.; Mustard, J. F.; Pieters, C. M.; Forsyth, D. W. (1997). "Optimization of endmembers for spectral mixture analysis". Remote Sensing of Environment. 59 (3): 472–489. Bibcode:1997RSEnv..59..472T. doi:10.1016/S0034-4257(96)00122-8.
- Conder, James A.; Scheirer, Daniel S.; Forsyth, Donald W. (2000). "Seafloor spreading on the Amsterdam-St. Paul hotspot plateau". Journal of Geophysical Research: Solid Earth. 105 (B4): 8263–8277. Bibcode:2000JGR...105.8263C. doi:10.1029/1999JB900406.
- Conder, James A.; Forsyth, Donald W. (2001). "Seafloor spreading on the Southeast Indian Ridge over the last one million years: A test of the Capricorn plate hypothesis". Earth and Planetary Science Letters. 188 (1–2): 91–105. Bibcode:2001E&PSL.188...91C. doi:10.1016/S0012-821X(01)00326-0.
- Forsyth, Donald W. (2013). "Geophysical Constraints on Mantle Flow and Melt Generation Beneath Mid-Ocean Ridges". Mantle Flow and Melt Generation at Mid-Ocean Ridges. Geophysical Monograph Series. pp. 1–65. doi:10.1029/GM071p0001. ISBN 9781118663875.
