= Tectonophysics (journal) =

Peer-reviewed scientific journal

- Discipline: Geophysics, Earth-surface processes
- Language: English
- Edited by: R.Govers, L.Jolivet, M.Liu, H.Thybo, A. Yin

Publication details
- History: 1964–present
- Publisher: Elsevier
- Frequency: 28/year
- Open access: Hybrid
- Impact factor: 2.433 (2011)

Standard abbreviations
- ISO 4: Tectonophysics

Indexing
- CODEN: TCTOAM
- ISSN: 0040-1951
- LCCN: 68004714
- OCLC no.: 1767232

Links
- Journal homepage; Online access

Tectonophysics, The International Journal of Geotectonics and the Geology and Physics of the Interior of the Earth is a weekly peer-reviewed scientific journal published by Elsevier. It was established in 1964 and covers the field of tectonophysics, including kinematics, structure, composition, and dynamics of the solid Earth at all scales.

== Organization ==
The editors-in-chief are Samuel Angiboust (ENS de Lyon), Jean-Philippe Avouac (California Institute of Technology), Ramon Carbonell (Spanish National Research Council), Rob Govers (Utrecht University), Zheng Xiang Li (Curtin University), and Kelin Wang (Geological Survey of Canada).

== Abstracting and indexing ==
This journal is abstracted and indexed in over fifty databases, including Current Contents, GeoRef, Inspec, Scopus, and Web of Science.

== Notable articles ==
According to the Journal Citation Reports, Tectonophysics has a 2011 impact factor of 2.433. The three most highly cited papers in Tectonophysics as of September 2011 are:

- Sengör, A. M. Celâl; Yilmaz, Yücel (1981). "Tethyan evolution of Turkey: A plate tectonic approach". Tectonophysics. 75 (3–4): 181–190, 193–199, 203–241. Bibcode:1981Tectp..75..181S. doi:10.1016/0040-1951(81)90275-4.
- J. Dercourt; L.P. Zonenshain; L.-E. Ricou; V.G. Kazmin; X. Le Pichon; A.L. Knipper; C. Grandjacquet; I.M. Sbortshikov; J. Geyssant; C. Lepvrier; D.H. Pechersky; J. Boulin; J.-C. Sibuet; L.A. Savostin; O. Sorokhtin; M. Westphal; M.L. Bazhenov; J.P. Lauer; B. Biju-Duval (1986). "Geological evolution of the Tethys belt from the Atlantic to the Pamirs since the LIAS". Tectonophysics. 123 (1–4): 241–315. Bibcode:1986Tectp.123..241D. doi:10.1016/0040-1951(86)90199-X.
- Lepichon, X.; Angelier, J. (1979). "Hellenic arc and trench system — Key to the neotectonic evolution of the eastern Mediterranean". Tectonophysics. 60 (1–2): 1–42. Bibcode:1979Tectp..60....1P. doi:10.1016/0040-1951(79)90131-8.
