= Carolina Lithgow-Bertelloni =

Geophysicist

Carolina Raquel Lithgow-Bertelloni
- Born: Santo Domingo, Dominican Republic
- Education: University of California, Berkeley
- Scientific career
- Thesis: The history and dynamics of plate motions (1994)

Carolina Raquel Lithgow-Bertelloni is a geophysicist known for her research on the role of subsurface processes in shaping the Earth. She was elected a fellow of the American Geophysical Union in 2021.

== Education and career ==
Lithgow-Bertelloni has a B.Sc. from the University of Puerto Rico (1987) and earned her Ph.D. from the University of California, Berkeley in 1994. Following her Ph.D., Lithgow-Bertelloni held positions at Universität Göttingen, Georgia Tech, Carnegie Institution of Washington before becoming an assistant professor at the University of Michigan in 1997, where she remained until 2011. She subsequently held multiple positions at University College London, Roma Tre University, and Carnegie Institute of Washington. In 2018, Lithgow-Bertelloni became the Louis B. and Martha B. Slichter Endowed Chair in Geosciences at the University of California, Los Angeles.

== Research ==
The research done by Lithgow-Bertelloni combines planetary science and geophysics. She is particularly interested in how processes below the surface, e.g., in the mantle, drive processes occurring on Earth's surface. Her research includes investigations into the movement of tectonic plates, particularly in the geological past. She has examined processes that contribute to variability in plate motion including mineralogy in the subsurface and chemical heterogeneity in the mantle. Her research has contributed to our understanding of the early history of the Hawaiian-Emperor seamount chain and the role of changes in viscosity in establishing a boundary in the mantle at one megameter below the Earth's surface. Lithgow-Bertelloni has also described the movement of oceanic plates, potentially distinct from the movement of land masses, over geologic time.

=== Selected publications ===
- Lithgow-Bertelloni, Carolina; Richards, Mark A. (February 1998). "The dynamics of Cenozoic and Mesozoic plate motions". Reviews of Geophysics. 36 (1): 27–78. Bibcode:1998RvGeo..36...27L. doi:10.1029/97RG02282. S2CID 53644159.
- Lithgow-Bertelloni, Carolina; Silver, Paul G. (September 1998). "Dynamic topography, plate driving forces and the African superswell". Nature. 395 (6699): 269–272. Bibcode:1998Natur.395..269L. doi:10.1038/26212. S2CID 4414115.
- Conrad, Clinton P.; Lithgow-Bertelloni, Carolina (4 October 2002). "How Mantle Slabs Drive Plate Tectonics". Science. 298 (5591): 207–209. Bibcode:2002Sci...298..207C. doi:10.1126/science.1074161. PMID 12364804. S2CID 36766442.
- Stixrude, Lars; Lithgow-Bertelloni, Carolina (August 2005). "Thermodynamics of mantle minerals - I. Physical properties". Geophysical Journal International. 162 (2): 610–632. Bibcode:2005GeoJI.162..610S. doi:10.1111/j.1365-246X.2005.02642.x. hdl:2027.42/73485.

== Awards and honors ==
- Kavli Frontiers of Science, National Academy of Sciences (2003)
- Francis Birch Lecture, American Geophysical Union (2018)
- Fellow, American Geophysical Union (2021)

== Personal life ==
Lithgow-Bertelloni's sister, Anna M. Lithgow-Bertelloni, is also a scientist and works on natural products from marine organisms, one of which may aid in fighting against SARS-CoV-2.

Lithgow-Bertelloni resides in Santa Monica, California.
