= Kelin Wang =

Canadian geophysicist

- Education: University of Western Ontario
- Scientific career
- Fields: geodynamics
- Workplaces: Geological Survey of Canada University of Victoria

Kelin Wang is a senior research scientist and has worked for the Geological Survey of Canada since 1992. His research encompasses geodynamics and natural hazards, with major contributions in researching slow-slip events along the Cascadia subduction interface.

== Academic career ==
After pursuing his Bachelor's of Science degree in geology from Peking University in 1982, Wang continued his education by achieving his doctoral degree in geophysics from University of Western Ontario in 1989. Being a specialist in his field of work led him to becoming an adjunct professor at University of Victoria in 1999, where he currently teaches. Due to his accomplishments, he was named Honorary Research Professor at University of Victoria in 2017.

== Honors and awards ==
Most of Wang's awards are fairly recent. He was awarded the J. Tuzo Wilson Medal by the Canadian Geophysical Union in 2015. and was Distinguished Elected Birch Lecturer by the American Geophysical Union in 2015. In 2016 he became an Elected Fellow of the American Geophysical Union and in 2017, Wang was named Honorary Research Professor at the University of Victoria.

== Research ==
At the Geological Survey of Canada, Wang researches subduction zones and their associated geodynamics. In addition to geodynamics, his interests are in earthquake and tsunami hazards, while some of his works include Earth's lithospheric processes in relation to subduction zones and mantle flow.

His most notable work includes methods that use geodetic data from different Subductions zones in the deformation cycle. Utilizing geodetic data with modeling figures creates a unified picture that shows how deformation is controlled by short and long-term viscous behavior of the mantle. In addition to this, he used 2D and 3D numerical subduction earthquake cycle models paired with Global Positioning System (GPS) data to demonstrate different deformational patterns and land movement in response to earthquakes. He also analyzes the diversity of subduction zones by looking at multiple different slabs which have different ages and thermal gradients. Wang also uses a 3D model called CAS3D-2 which was used to model interseismic deformation rates at the Cascadia subduction zone. This model records intervals of the deformation field that change with time.
