= Stratigraphy and Geological Correlation =

- Discipline: Geology
- Language: English
- Edited by: Mikhail A. Semikhatov

Publication details
- History: 1993-present
- Publisher: Springer Science+Business Media on behalf of MAIK Nauka/Interperiodica
- Frequency: Bimonthly
- Impact factor: 0.864 (2011)

Standard abbreviations
- ISO 4: Stratigr. Geol. Correl.

Indexing
- ISSN: 0869-5938 (print); 1555-6263 (web)
- LCCN: 93641701
- OCLC no.: 457267453

Links
- Journal homepage; Online access

Stratigraphy and Geological Correlation is a bimonthly peer-reviewed scientific journal covering fundamental and applied aspects of stratigraphy. It was established in 1993 and is published by Springer Science+Business Media on behalf of MAIK Nauka/Interperiodica.
