= Tectonophysics =

Study of the physical processes that underlie tectonic deformation

Tectonophysics, a branch of geophysics, is the study of the physical processes that underlie tectonic deformation. This includes measurement or calculation of the stress- and strain fields on Earth’s surface and the rheologies of the crust, mantle, lithosphere and asthenosphere.

== Overview ==
Tectonophysics is concerned with movements in the Earth's crust and deformations over scales from meters to thousands of kilometers. These govern processes on local and regional scales and at structural boundaries, such as the destruction of continental crust (e.g. gravitational instability) and oceanic crust (e.g. subduction), convection in the Earth's mantle (availability of melts), the course of continental drift, and second-order effects of plate tectonics such as thermal contraction of the lithosphere. This involves the measurement of a hierarchy of strains in rocks and plates as well as deformation rates; the study of laboratory analogues of natural systems; and the construction of models for the history of deformation.

== History ==
Tectonophysics was adopted as the name of a new section of AGU on April 19, 1940, at AGU's 21st Annual Meeting. According to the AGU website (https://tectonophysics.agu.org/agu-100/section-history/), using the words from Norman Bowen, the main goal of the tectonophysics section was to “designate this new borderline field between geophysics, physics and geology … for the solution of problems of tectonics.” Consequently, the claim below that the term was defined in 1954 by Gzolvskii is clearly incorrect. Since 1940 members of AGU had been presenting papers at AGU meetings, the contents of which defined the meaning of the field.

Tectonophysics was defined as a field in 1954 when Mikhail Vladimirovich Gzovskii published three papers in the journal Izvestiya Akad. Nauk SSSR, Sireya Geofizicheskaya: "On the tasks and content of tectonophysics", "Tectonic stress fields", and "Modeling of tectonic stress fields". He defined the main goals of tectonophysical research to be study of the mechanisms of folding and faulting as well as large structural units of the Earth's crust. He later created the Laboratory of Tectonophysics at the Institute of Physics of the Earth, Academy of Sciences of the USSR, Moscow.

== Applications ==
In coal mines, large amounts of horizontal stress on the rock (around two to three times greater than the vertical pressure from the overlying rock) are caused by tectonic stress and can be predicted with plate tectonics stress maps. For example, because West Virginia experiences tectonic stress from east to west, as of around the 1990s significantly more roof collapses occurred in mines running north to south than in mines running east to west.

== See also ==
- Geodynamics
- Palaeogeography
- Rock mechanics
- Seafloor spreading
- Structural geology
- Tectonophysics (journal)
