= Vladimir Tikhomirov =

Soviet geologist and historian of science (1915–1994)

Vladimir Vladimirovich Tikhomirov
- Владимир Владимирович Тихомиров
- Born: 25 October [O.S. 12 October] 1915; Petrograd, Russian Empire
- Died: 13 January 1994 (aged 78); Moscow, Russia
- Education: Azerbaijan Industrial Institute
- Known for: Founder of the Department of History of Geology, GIN RAS; founder of INHIGEO
- Awards: Order of the October Revolution; Order of the Red Banner of Labour; Order of the Badge of Honour; Order of the Patriotic War, 1st and 2nd class
- Scientific career
- Fields: Geology, History of geology
- Workplaces: Geological Institute RAS; Vernadsky State Geological Museum
- Thesis: Geology of the Lesser Caucasus (1949)
- Doctoral advisor: V. E. Khain; V. V. Belousov

Vladimir Vladimirovich Tikhomirov (Russian: Влади́мир Влади́мирович Тихоми́ров; 25 October 1915 – 13 January 1994) was a Soviet and Russian geologist and historian of geoscience. He specialized in the regional geology of the Caucasus, stratigraphy, and tectonics, but is best known as a founder and organizer of the discipline of history of geology. He established the first dedicated academic unit for the history of geology in the USSR and was a founder and the first president of the International Commission on the History of Geological Sciences (INHIGEO).

== Biography ==
Tikhomirov was born in Petrograd (now Saint Petersburg) in 1915. His father, Vladimir Ivanovich Tikhomirov (1881–1961), was a professor of physical chemistry and an Honored Scientist of the Azerbaijan SSR. In 1920, the family moved to Baku.

He began working as a laboratory assistant at the Azerbaijan Petroleum Institute in 1931. In 1932, he entered the Geological Prospecting Faculty of the Azerbaijan Industrial Institute in Baku. As a student from 1935 to 1937, he participated in geological mapping in the Caucasus under the guidance of V. E. Khain, studying Jurassic and Cretaceous deposits and olistostromes. He graduated with distinction in 1938.

=== Early geological career and war service (1938–1944) ===
After graduation, Tikhomirov worked as a field geologist for the Azerbaijan Geological Department, leading survey and prospecting parties. He studied deposits of gypsum, cinnabar, oil shale, and bentonite clays, compiling geological maps and gathering material for a candidate's dissertation. During this period, he also received military training. In the spring of 1939, he qualified as a reserve officer and became a Junior Lieutenant specializing as an aerial observer.

Despite being in a reserved occupation as a geologist, Tikhomirov volunteered for active duty in 1942 during World War II. After political training, he was sent to the Leningrad Front as a political commissar (zampolit) for a communications squadron of the 13th Air Army. Commissars were forbidden from flying combat missions, but Tikhomirov obtained permission to fly from February 1943, becoming one of only two "flying commissars" on the Leningrad Front. In May 1943, he became the squadron's navigator.

On 18 April 1944, he was severely wounded by a mine explosion near the village of Sitenka, resulting in total blindness. He was treated in hospitals in Luga and Leningrad, and consulted with the renowned ophthalmologist Vladimir Filatov in Odessa, but his sight could not be restored.

=== Academic career in the history of geology (1944–1994) ===
After demobilization due to his disability, Tikhomirov enrolled in postgraduate studies at the Moscow Geological Prospecting Institute (MGRI), with crucial support from Professor V. V. Belousov. He dictated his research to assistants who read scientific literature to him for many hours each day. In the spring of 1949, he defended his dissertation on the geology of the Lesser Caucasus. Based on extensive pre-war field data, the dissertation was so comprehensive that the academic council first recommended a candidate's degree, but three months later, after a third opponent's review, he was awarded the higher degree of Doctor of Sciences.

==== At the Geological Institute ====
In 1949, invited by Academician Nikolai Shatsky, Tikhomirov joined the Institute of Geological Sciences (IGN) of the USSR Academy of Sciences (later GIN AN SSSR, now GIN RAS). In May 1950, he was approved as a senior researcher in tectonics and was tasked with creating a new academic unit.

He founded and headed the cabinet (later department) of history of geology, the first institution in the USSR dedicated to the systematic study of the history of geological knowledge. He led this department for decades, building a research team and establishing it as a national and international coordinating center.

In 1953, he founded the influential publication series "Essays on the History of Geological Knowledge" (Ocherki po istorii geologicheskikh znaniy), serving as its editor until 1992. That same year, he was also urged by Academician Vladimir Obruchev in letters to continue work in the history of geology. In January 1955, he was approved as a professor in the history of geological sciences. His co-authored textbook on the history of geology was translated into Chinese and had a significant impact on spreading the discipline.

==== International leadership ====
Tikhomirov was a key figure in establishing the history of geology as an international scientific field. In 1967, he founded and became the first president (serving until 1976) of the International Commission on the History of Geological Sciences (INHIGEO), which operates under the International Union of Geological Sciences (IUGS) and the International Union of the History and Philosophy of Science. He remained active in the organization as past president, vice-president, and bureau member until his death.

He also served as:

- Chairman of the Commission on Geological Knowledge of the USSR (from 1958).
- Scientific consultant for geology for the 3rd edition of the Great Soviet Encyclopedia (1970–1978).
- Editor-in-chief of the 50-volume reference work "Geological Knowledge of the USSR" (1969–1992).
- Advisor to the Directorate of GIN AN SSSR (from 1988) and later at the Vernadsky State Geological Museum (from 1991).

Vladimir Tikhomirov died in Moscow on 13 January 1994. His official farewell was held at the Geological Institute RAS, and he was buried at the Troyekurovskoye Cemetery (section 3).

== Awards and honors ==
=== State and academic awards ===
Tikhomirov received numerous awards for his military service, scientific work, and contributions to education:

- Order of the October Revolution (1976)
- Order of the Red Banner of Labour (1985)
- Order of the Patriotic War, 1st class (1985) and 2nd class (1943)
- Order of the Red Star (1947)
- Order of the Badge of Honour (1971)
- Medal "For Labour Valour" (1953)
- Medal "For the Defence of Leningrad" (1943)
- Medal "For the Defence of the Caucasus" (1946)
- Medal "For the Victory over Germany" (1945)
- Medal "For Valiant Labour in the Great Patriotic War" (1945)
- First Prize of the Moscow Society of Naturalists (1953, for his monograph on the Lesser Caucasus; and 1964, for his book on geology in 19th-century Russia)
- Badge "Excellence in Mineral Exploration" (1965, 1975, 1980)
- Abraham-Gottlob-Werner Silver Honorary Badge, German Democratic Republic (1983)

=== Memberships and recognition ===
He was a member of geological societies of different countries.:

- 1955: Member of the Commission on Geological Knowledge of the USSR
- 1965: Member of the International Academy of the History of Science (corresponding member 1963–1965)
- 1967: Founder and first president of INHIGEO (International Commission on the History of Geological Sciences)
- 1974: Foreign Corresponding Member of the Madrid Academy of Doctors
- 1976: Honorary Member of the Geological Society of the GDR
- 1981: Corresponding Member of the USSR Academy of Sciences (Department of Geology, Geophysics and Geochemistry)

=== Legacy ===
- 1998: A fossil species of ostracod was named in his honor.
- 2012: The IUGS established the Vladimir V. Tikhomirov History of Geology Award to recognize outstanding contributions to the field.

== Selected publications ==
Tikhomirov was the author of over 200 scientific works, including monographs and textbooks.

- Тихомиров В. В. (1950). Малый Кавказ в верхнемеловое время (основные типы отложений и условия их образований) [The Lesser Caucasus in the Upper Cretaceous (Main Types of Deposits and Conditions of their Formation)]. Transactions of IGN AN SSSR (in Russian). Vol. 123. Moscow: USSR Academy of Sciences. p. 224.
- Тихомиров В. В.; Хаин В. Е. (1956). Краткий очерк истории геологии [A Brief Outline of the History of Geology] (in Russian). Moscow: Gosgeoltekhizdat. p. 260.
- Тихомиров В. В. (1960–1963). Геология в России первой половины XIX века [Geology in Russia in the First Half of the 19th Century] (in Russian). Vol. 1 & 2. Moscow: USSR Academy of Sciences. (In two parts)
