= History of Geology and Mining (Information System) =

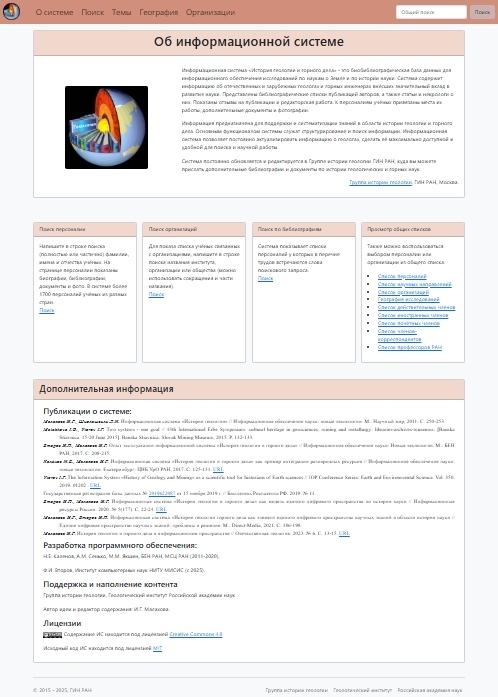
- Website type: Online Bibliography database
- Available in: Russian, English
- Website: https://higeo.ru/
- Commercial: No
- Launched: May 1, 2015; 11 years ago
- Current status: Active

Information System "History of Geology and Mining" (Russian: Информационная система «История геологии и горного дела») is a scientific information system (knowledge base, bibliographic database and non-commercial website) containing biographical, bibliographical data and documents about scientists, scientific organizations, and publications related to geological and mining sciences. It is a joint project of the Geological Institute and the Library for Natural Sciences of the Russian Academy of Sciences. It represents the first attempt to systematize and provide access to a large array of data in the field of the history of geology and mining. It was created to support and facilitate scientific research in the history of science.

== History ==
The information system is a continuation of the printed publications in the series “Materials on the History of Geology in the USSR”.

Versions of the "History of Geology and Mining" information system:

- Test version on the Library for Natural Sciences of the Russian Academy of Sciences website (2011—2015 — scirus.benran.ru/higeo.
- At the Geological Institute RAS: 2015–2025 at higeo.ginras.ru. New test version at https://higeo.ru

== Description and structure ==
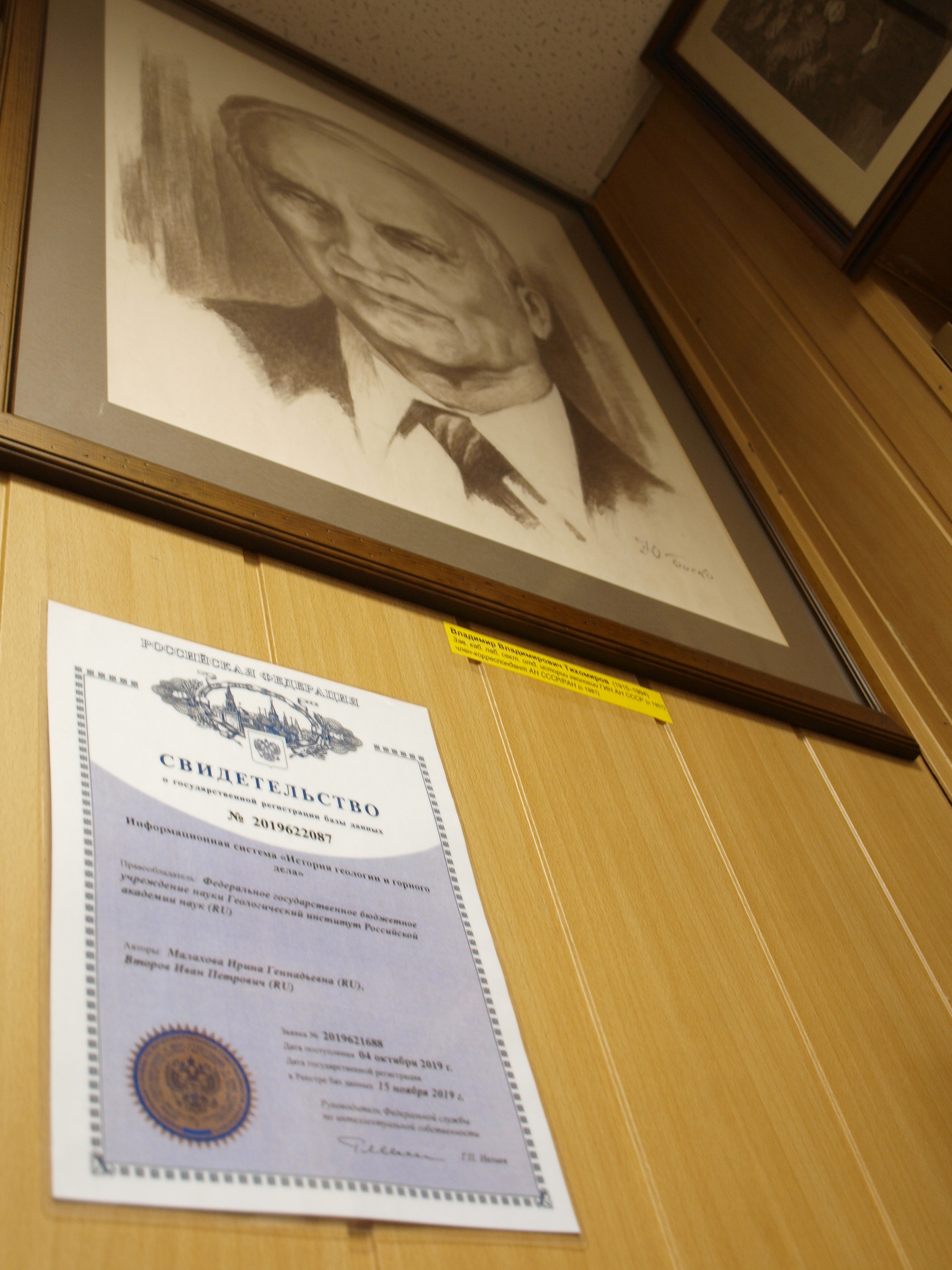

The system was created based on the customizable network software complex "SciRus" developed at the Library for Natural Sciences of the Russian Academy of Sciences (part of the Information and Library Council of the RAS). Software development by: N. Kalenov, A. Senko, and M. Yakshin.

The information system on the history of geology includes core data about scientists:

- Data for scientific biographies of scientists
- Organizations (academies, educational institutions, institutes, and scientific societies), geography and research directions
- Printed sources (journals, newspapers, and other serial publications)
- Brief scientific biographies of scientists (under development)
- Major scientific works and references to them (URLs and DOIs are provided where available)
- Literature about scientists and references to it (URLs are provided where available)
- Documents related to scientists (questionnaires, manuscripts, event programs, correspondence, and other documents)
- Links to portraits of scientists, group photographs, engravings, and other images.

The data array is centered around the scientist's profile. A large portion of the documents are still being processed or are currently in closed access: about 10,000 folders on scientists, >15,000 photographs and other images.

Internal integrated search across many parameters is the primary functionality of the Information System.

== History ==
Since 1949, Vladimir Vladimirovich Tikhomirov began collecting materials on the history of geological sciences at the Institute of Geological Sciences of the USSR Academy of Sciences (predecessor of the Geological Institute of the Russian Academy of Sciences). In 1951, he founded and headed the "Office of the History of Geological Sciences". A group of historians of science and bibliographers continued to collect and process information on the history of Earth sciences, actively began surveying geologists from across the USSR, and compiling bibliographies of scientists' works on bibliographic cards. Additionally, they collected photographs, illustrations for publications, and information about various geological scientific organizations and events (congresses, meetings, conferences, anniversaries, and other events).

In 1956, upon the formation of the Geological Institute of the USSR Academy of Sciences, the "Office" was renamed the "Laboratory of the History of Geology", and later the "Department for the history of geology". Based on the collected material, the following began to be published:

- 1961—1992 — Materials of the Commission for the Geological Study of the USSR.
- 1965—1973 — Biographies and bibliographies of scientists in the form of bibliographic dictionaries, edited for the first 7 issues by V. V. Tikhomirov.

In 1991, the Department for the history of geology moved to the newly established Vernadsky State Geological Museum.

Data collection began using Microsoft Access; by 2007, brief information on 1,700 scientists whose works were significant for the development of Earth sciences had been entered. The system was then planned to be integrated into the standard software complex "Scientific Institute of the RAS", in cooperation with the Dorodnitsyn Computing Centre of the RAS.

In 2008, the history of geology group began work under the Program of the RAS Presidium — the Electronic Library "Scientific Heritage of Russia", which united information resources of scientific institutes, archives, and libraries of the RAS. The library hosted publications of naturalists and geologists (up to 1945), their biographical essays, and portraits. A section "Natural History Collections" was created with descriptions of museum items from historical and monographic collections related to scientists. Therefore, the modern information system is integrated (links to scientific works, information about authors, etc.) with the "Scientific Heritage of Russia" electronic library.

Research on the topic of the Information System "History of Geology and Mining" began in 2010. Under modern conditions, processing the accumulated materials was only possible using information technology, and to maximize cooperation with the scientific community, it was decided to place it on the Internet. The Department of the History of Geology, together with the Library for Natural Sciences of the RAS (BEN RAS), began developing a new Internet resource — the information system "History of Geology and Mining". Since 2011, the system began to be populated with lists of scientific works and literature about scientists. Priority was given to full members, corresponding members, and foreign members (professors, extraordinary and ordinary academicians) of the national academy, which changed its name over time:

Since May 2015, following the return of the research unit "Group of the History of Geology" to the Geological Institute RAS (GI RAS), the Information System came under the management of GI RAS and BEN RAS. From 2015 to 2018, the scientific work of populating the system was a planned research topic for fundamental research at GI RAS — "History of Major Achievements in Geology and Mining Sciences: Information System 'History of Geology and Mining'".

In 2019, the information system moved to the Geological Institute of the Russian Academy of Sciences (higeo.ginras.ru), featuring over 900 scientists. The database volume is about 2 gigabytes. Registered with Rospatent: authors — I. G. Malakhova and I. P. Vtorov, rights holder — Geological Institute RAS.

The number of scientist profiles with their bibliographies presented in the Information System is constantly increasing: 2021 — 1200; 2024 — 1700; 2026 — over 1900 geologists.

Since 2017, the Information System has been used by 5th-year students of the Geological Faculty of Moscow State University in the History of Geology course.

== See also ==
- Bibliography
- Information system
- History of geology

== Literature ==
- Yakshin M. M. Novy'e vozmozhnosti programmnogo kompleksa «SciRus» [New Capabilities of the "SciRus" Software Complex] // Informacionnoe obespechenie nauki: Novy'e texnologii. Presentation, 2013.
- Yakshin M. M. Razvitie platformy' SciRus [Development of the SciRus Platform] // Informacionnoe obespechenie nauki: Novy'e texnologii. M.: BEN RAN, 2015. P. 203–207.
- Kalenov N. E., Malakhova I. G. Informacionnaya sistema «Istoriya geologii i gornogo dela» kak primer integracii raznorodny'x resursov [Information System "History of Geology and Mining" as an Example of Integration of Heterogeneous Resources] // Informacionnoe obespechenie nauki: novy'e texnologii. Ekaterinburg: CNB UrO RAN, 2017. P. 125–131.
- Vtorov I. P. The Information System «History of Geology and Mining» as a scientific tool for historians of Earth sciences // IOP Publishing: Earth and Environmental Science. 2019. Vol. 350. 012020. DOI 10.1088/1755-1315/350/1/012020
- Malakhova I. G., Vtorov I. P. Informacionnaya sistema «Istoriya geologii i gornogo dela» kak e'lement edinogo cifrovogo prostranstva nauchny'x znanij v oblasti istorii nauki [Information System "History of Geology and Mining" as an Element of the Unified Digital Space of Scientific Knowledge in the Field of History of Science] // Edinoe cifrovoe prostranstvo nauchny'x znanij: problemy' i resheniya [Unified Digital Space of Scientific Knowledge: Problems and Solutions]. Moscow: Direkt-Media, 2021. P. 186–198.
- Malakhova I.G., Vtorov I.P, Kirillov S.A. The History of Geosciences as the Resource for the Digital Space of Scientific Knowledge of the Russian Academy of Sciences // CEUR Workshop Proceedings. Vol. 2990. 2021. P. 50–61.
- Rogov M. A. Osnovy' raboty' s nauchnoj informaciej v seti Internet dlya geologov i biologov / Otv. red. N. B. Kuznecov. M.: GIN RAN, 2022. (Trudy' Geologicheskogo instituta RAN; Vyp. 633). [Fundamentals of Working with Scientific Information on the Internet for Geologists and Biologists / Ed. by N. B. Kuznetsov. M.: GI RAS, 2022. (Proceedings of the Geological Institute RAS; Iss. 633).]
