= Barry Cooper (geologist) =

Australian geologist and historian (1948–2023)

Barry J. Cooper
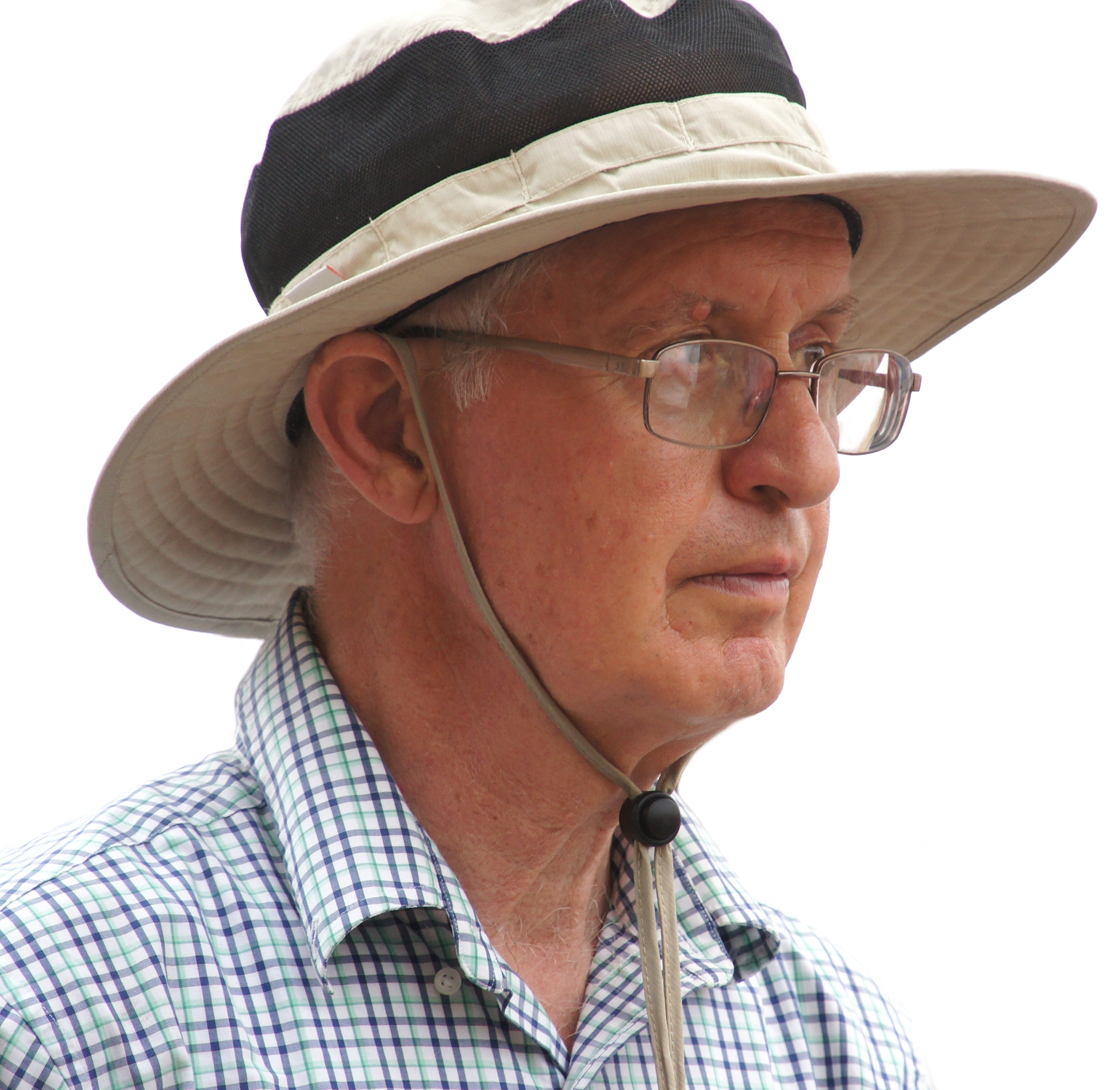
- 2017
- Born: 23 September 1948; Ivanhoe, Victoria
- Died: 13 October 2023 (75); Adelaide
- Known for: History of geology works
- Scientific career
- Fields: Geology, History of geology
- Institutions: University of South Australia

Barry J. Cooper (1948–2023) was an Australian geologist, professor at the University of South Australia, historian of geology and public figure. President of the International Commission on the History of Geological Sciences (2016-2020).

External image
- Barry Cooper on Flickr

== Biography ==
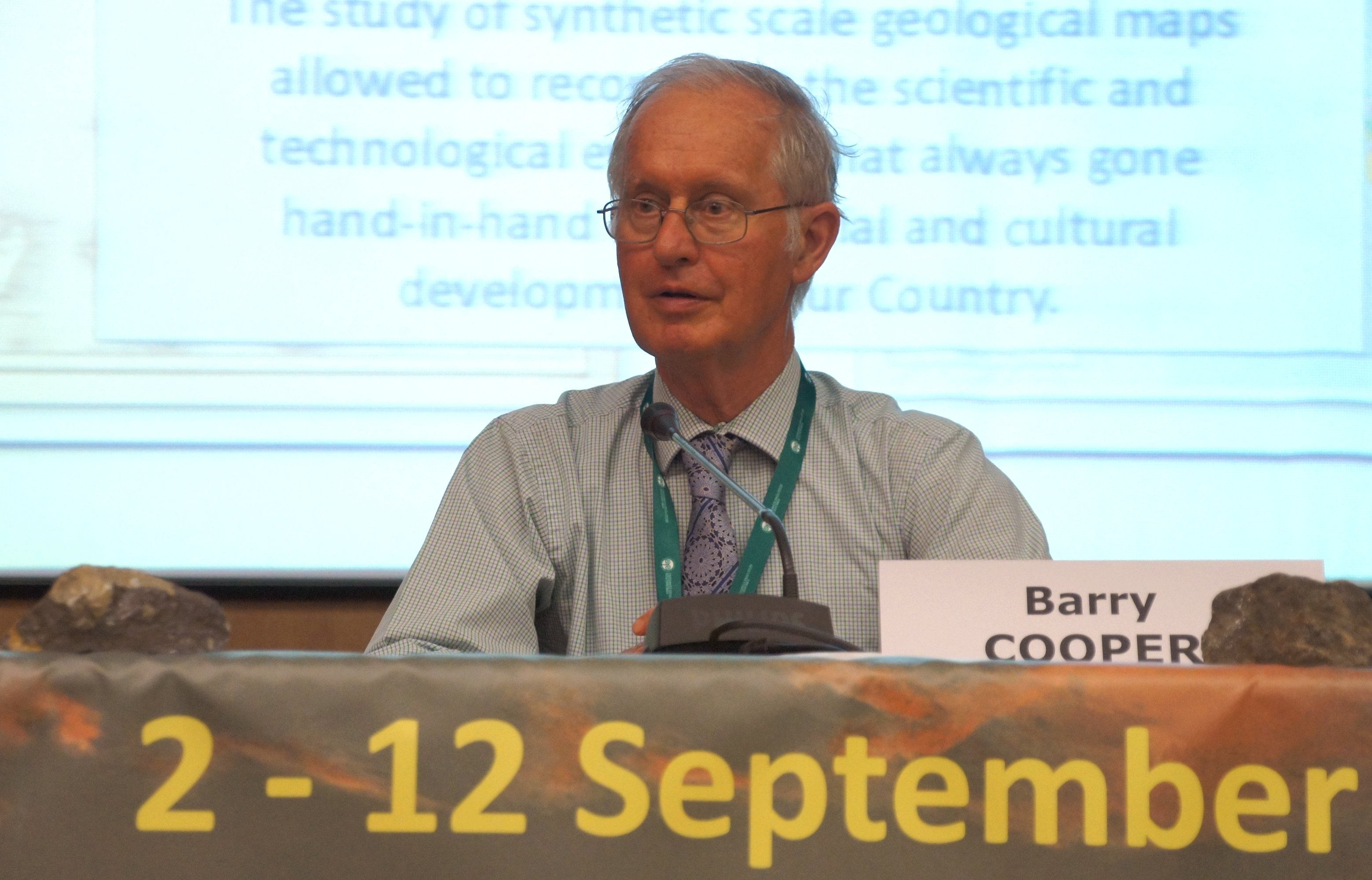
Barry Cooper, 2019

Cooper was born on September 23, 1948 in Ivanhoe, Victoria, Australia. He completed his PhD in 1974 at the Ohio State University School of Earth Sciences.

He worked as a professor of geology at the University of South Australia in Adelaide and Whyalla, and conducted research in the field of paleontology, history of geology and popularization of stone heritage. He was a long-standing active member of many Australian and international organizations and meetings in the geological sciences and their history.

Cooper died on October 13, 2023, in Adelaide, South Australia.

== Awards ==
The following medals were awarded from the Geological Society of Australia:

- 2019: Bruce Webb Medal, for contribution to the study of geology of the state of South Australia
- 2021: Tom Vallance Medal, for his contribution to the history of geosciences in Australia

== Membership ==
- Geological Society of Australia
- Geological Society of America
- Secretary General (2008–2016) and then President (2016–2020) of the International Commission on the History of Geological Sciences (INHIGEO)
- Founder and Secretary General of the Stone Heritage Task Force, International Union of Geological Sciences (IUGS).

== Links ==
- Publications - The National Library of Australia
- Past-president INHIGEO
- Publications on researchgate.net
- Tom Vallance Medal, 2021.
