= Vladimir V. Tikhomirov History of Geology Award =

International history of geology award

V. V. Tikhomirov History of Geology Award
- Awarded for: scientific contributions and achievements in the field of history of geological sciences
- Presented by: INHIGEO, IUGS
- Established: 2012

Highlights
- Total: 4
- Website: https://inhigeo.org/awards
- Related: History of Geology

Vladimir V. Tikhomirov History of Geology Award is a geological and historical medal of the International Union of Geological Sciences (IUGS). It is the only international award for scientific contributions and achievements in the field of history of geological sciences.

== History ==
Named in honor of the Soviet historian of geology Vladimir Vladimirovich Tikhomirov (1915–1994) — the organizer and first president of the International Commission on the History of Geological Sciences (INHIGEO) in 1967. Nominations for the award are made by the International Commission on the History of Geological Sciences (INHIGEO), approved by the International Union of Geological Sciences (IUGS).

In 2012, the medal was established by the International Union of Geological Sciences for work on the history of geology. The medal is made of bronze.

Since 2020, the medal with a diameter of 10 cm is made of Armenian obsidian.

== Awards ==
External images
- Medal in 2012
- Medals from 2020

The medal is awarded every four years during the International Geological Congress.

Throughout history, the medal has been awarded to:

- 2012 — Hugh Torrens, United Kingdom
- 2016 — Martin J. S. Rudwick, United Kingdom
- 2020 — David Branagan (Branagan David Francis (1930–2022)), Australia
- 2024 — Kenneth L. Taylor United States

== Links ==
- https://inhigeo.org/awards/ - INHIGEO Vladimir V. Tikhomirov History of Geology Award
- Longtime OU Professor to Receive International Award in Geology History (2024).
