= Reijer Hooykaas =

Dutch historian of science

- Born: 1 August 1906; Schoonhoven, Netherlands
- Died: 4 January 1994 (aged 87); Zeist, Netherlands
- Education: Doctor of Science
- Known for: INHIGEO president
- Scientific career
- Fields: History of science, history of geology

Reijer Hooykaas (1 August 1906 in Schoonhoven – 4 January 1994 in Zeist) was a Dutch historian of science. He along with Eduard Jan Dijksterhuis were pioneers in professionalizing the history of science in the Netherlands. Hooykaas gave the prestigious Gifford Lectures at St. Andrews in 1975-77. H. Floris Cohen dedicated his historiographical text The Scientific Revolution (University of Chicago Press, 1994) to Hooykaas; its section on religion deals primarily with Hooykaas.

== Life ==
He was born into a Calvinist family of silversmiths. Hooykaas studied chemistry and physics at the University of Utrecht graduating in 1933. While teaching high school chemistry and working on his Ph.D., he published articles on the history of science and religion, which brought his abilities to the attention of other scholars.

In 1946 he became the first to hold a history of science chair at a Dutch university. From 1946 to 1972 he was a professor at the Free University of Amsterdam (Vrije Universiteit Amsterdam).

In 1959 he became member of the Royal Netherlands Academy of Arts and Sciences.

In 1976—1984 he was president of the International Commission on the History of Geological Sciences (INHIGEO).

== Impatience ==
Hooykaas's impatience with certain modern historical attitudes has been the object of respect and praise. Fellow historian Malcolm Oster noted that Hooykaas was "personally irritated" by historians who conclude that early modern scientists with strong religious views must have had "some mental disorder." Examples of such scientists for Hooykaas are Blaise Pascal, Robert Boyle, and Isaac Newton.

== Work ==
- "Pascal: His Science and His Religion" Tractrix 1, 1989, pp. 115–139. (Translation of "Pascal: Zijn wetenschap en zijn religie", 1939 )
- "Science and Reformation", Cahiers d'histoire mondiale / Journal of World History, 3(1956): pp. 109–139.

In this once-important article defending the Protestantism thesis, Hooykaas shows "how the religious attitude of so-called 'ascetic' Protestantism, which more or less stood under Calvin's influence, furthered the development of science." This article is an acknowledged summary of (and thus has been superseded by) [Religion and the Rise of Modern Science (1972)]

- "Answer to Dr. Bainton's Comment on 'Science and Reformation'", Journal of World History, 3 (1957), pages 781-784.

Hooykaas defends the connection between Protestantism and the rise of science while distinguishing his position from Weber and Merton regarding economic activity. This short essay has been superseded by [his book Robert Boyle (1997)].

- "Science and Theology in the Middle Ages" Free University Quarterly 3, 1954, pp. 77–163.
- Natural Law and Divine Miracle: The Principle of Uniformity in Geology, Biology, and Theology, Leiden: EJ Brill, 1963

Though primarily focusing on discussions in the nineteenth century, the chapter on theology (outlining four different metaphysical positions) is also relevant to earlier debates.

- "Teilhardism, a pseudoscientific delusion" Free University Quarterly 9, 1963, pp. 1–57
- "Teilhardism, its predecessors, adherents and critics" Free University Quarterly 9, 1963, pp. 58–83
- "Catastrophism in Geology: Its Scientific Character in Relation to Actualism and Uniformitarianism " Nieuwe Reeks, Vol. 33, No. 7, 1971, pp. 271-316
- Religion and the Rise of Modern Science, Regent College Publishing, 2000 (Other edition Edinburgh: Scottish Academic Press, 1973 [1st Pub. 1972]). ISBN 1-57383-018-6

This book is a systematic and articulate attempt to show the philosophical as well as sociological connections between science and Protestantism in the sixteenth and seventeenth centuries. Hooykaas tends to oversimplify when he categorizes "types" of Christianity and of philosophy. His own theological biases sometimes intrude. But the book remains important for anyone doing work in our field. It is excellent for an introductory discussion of the philosophical issues--and especially as regards the relation of the "voluntaristic doctrine of God" to early modern natural philosophy. Hooykaas examines continental as well as English Calvinists and considers why and how they believed science should be cultivated: (1) to the glory of God and to the benefit of humankind; (2) empirically, in spite of human authorities; and (3) by using our hands. The book is a veritable mine of relevant biblical texts.

- Humanism and the Voyages of Discovery in 16th Century Portuguese Science and Letters, North-Holland Publishing Company, 1979, 67 pages
- "The Rise of Modern Science: When and Why?" British Journal for History of Science 20, 4, 1987, pp. 453–473.
- Robert Boyle: a study in science and Christian belief, University Press of America, 1997 ISBN 0-7618-0708-X

This work is important but [originally] in Dutch. It has been used as evidence by some scholars advancing the Protestantism-and-the-rise-of-science thesis. Hooykaas describes well Boyle's voluntaristic doctrine of God, his religious motivation and his justification for doing natural philosophy.

- Fact, Faith, and Fiction in the Development of Science, Volume 205 in the Boston Studies in the Philosophy of Science, Kluwer Academic Publishers, 1999, ISBN 0-7923-5774-4

== Works compared ==
The historian and theologian John Hedley Brooke has said that British chemist and historian Colin A. Russell's Cross-currents: interactions between science and faith (Leicester, 1985) shares some of Hooykaas's views.

== See also ==
- Hermeticism (history of science)
- List of science and religion scholars
- The Christian Virtuoso
