= International Commission on the History of Geological Sciences =

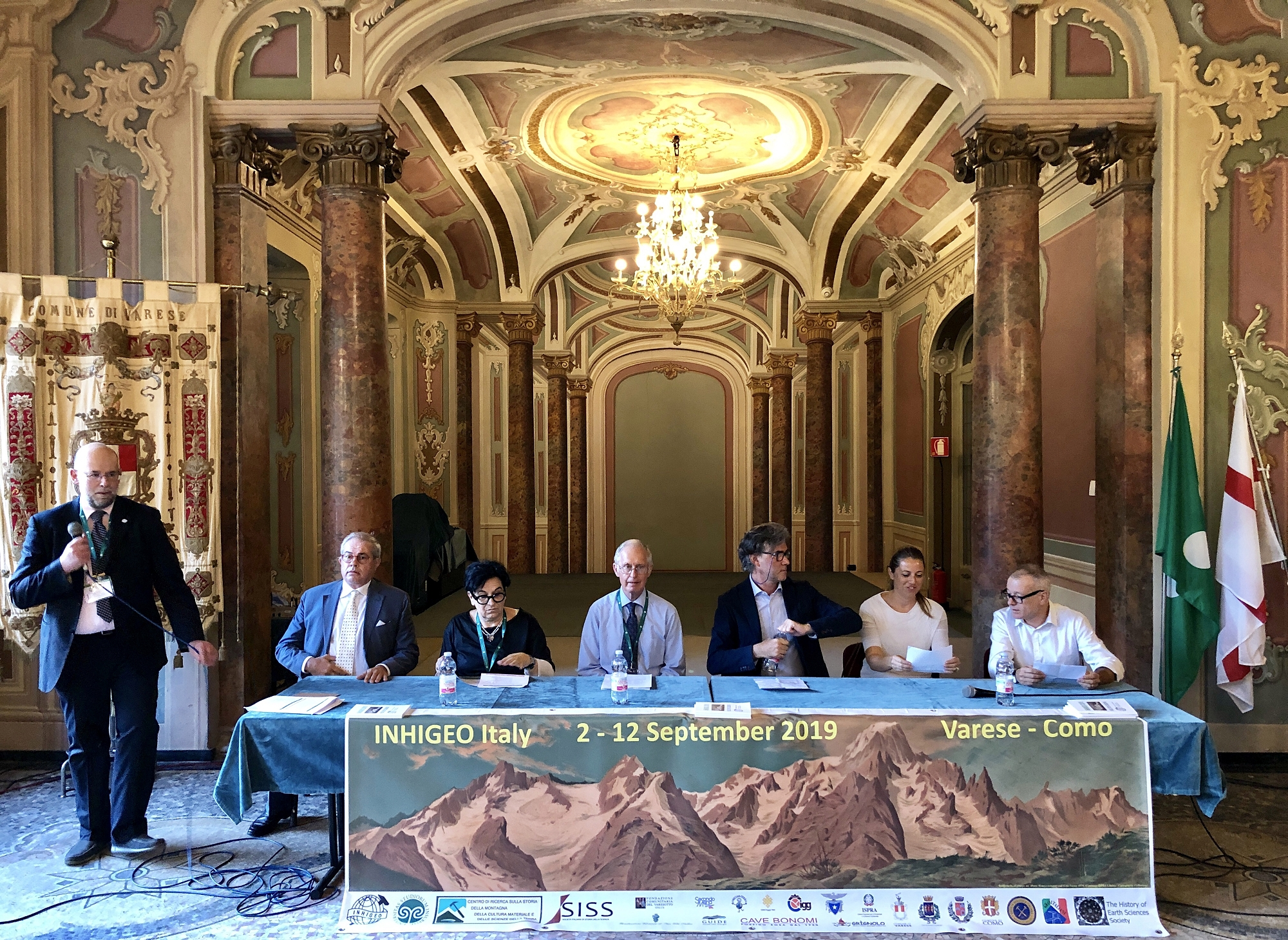
- Abbreviation: INHIGEO
- Formation: 1967
- Type: INGO
- Region served: Worldwide
- Members: Members, Associate Members
- Official language: English
- Main organ: Board of Management
- Parent organization: IUGS, IUHPS
- Website: www.inhigeo.org

The International Commission on the History of Geological Sciences (INHIGEO) promotes ongoing research into the history of the earth sciences, particularly the history of geology. It has 20 Honorary Senior Members and 301 members (2018) worldwide.

== History ==
INHIGEO has been established by the International Union of Geological Sciences (IUGS) and is also affiliated with the International Union of History and Philosophy of Science (IUHPS). The suggestion for the establishment of INHIGEO in 1967 was chiefly due to the ideas and efforts of the distinguished Russian geologist Vladimir Tikhomirov (1915–1994) from the Geological Institute of the USSR Academy of Sciences.

=== Board of Management ===
President:

1. 1967 — USSR — Vladimir V. Tikhomirov
2. 1976 — Netherlands — Reijer Hooykaas
3. 1984 — UK — Gordon Y. Craig
4. 1989 — GDR — Martin Guntau
5. 1992 — Australia — David Branagan
6. 1996 — UK — Hugh Torrens
7. 2000 — Portugal — Manuel Serrano Pinto
8. 2004 — France — Philippe Taquet
9. 2008 — Brazil — Silvia Fernanda de Mendonça Figueirôa
10. 2012 — USA — Kenneth L. Taylor
11. 2016 — Australia — Barry Cooper
12. 2020 — Italy — Ezio Vaccari

Secretary-General:

1. 1969 — Poland — Kazimierz Maślankiewicz
2. 1976 — GDR — Martin Guntau
3. 1984 — Hungary — Endre Dudich
4. 1989 — USA — Ursula Marvin
5. 1996 — Australia — David Oldroyd
6. 2004 — USA — Kennand Bork
7. 2008 — Australia — Barry Cooper
8. 2016 — Austria — Marianne Klemun
9. 2020 — Germany — Martina Kölbl-Ebert

== Objective ==
The primary objective of the Commission on the History of Geological Sciences involves promoting studies in the history of geological disciplines. In so doing, the Commission endeavours to stimulate and coordinate the activities of regional, national, and international organizations having shared purposes. The Commission also works to foster the publication of individual and collective works that illuminate the history of the geological sciences.

INHIGEO achieves its objective by sponsoring a major annual symposium with associated field activities. It also promotes publication of individual and collective works on the history of geology and issues a substantial "Annual Record" that details historical research into earth sciences worldwide, publicises other pertinent historical activities and provides scholarly reviews of recent literature on the subject.

== Affiliated associations ==
List of the INHIGEO affiliated associations (2018)

- International — History of Earth Sciences Society (HESS)
- Argentina — Comisión Argentina de Historia de la Geología
- Australia — Earth Sciences History Group, Geological Society of Australia (ESHG)
- Austria — Austrian Working Group History of Earth Sciences (AWGHES)
- China — Committee on the History of Geology, Geological Society of China
- France — Comité Français d’histoire de la Géologie (COFRHIGEO)
- Italy — History of Geoscience Section Geological Society of Italy
- Japan — Japanese Association for the History of Geosciences (JAHIGEO)
- Poland — Section on the History of Geological Sciences Polish Geological Society
- Poland — Polish Geological Institute
- Serbia — History of Geology Division
- Serbian — Srpsko geološko društvo (SGD)
- UK — History of Geology Group (HOGG) Geological Society of London
- Venezuela — Sociedad Venezolana de Historia de las Geociencias.

== Publications ==
- Celebrating 50 Years of INHIGEO / Editors W. Mayer, R. M. Clary, L. F. Azuela, N. S. Mots, S. Wolkowicz. London: GSL, 2017. 456 p. (GSL Special Publication; 442).
- Program and guidebook. INHIGEO, 2017. Armenia.
- Physis: Rivista Internazionale di Storia della Scienza. 2021. Vol. 56. Fasc. 1/2. (The History of Geological Sciences as a disciplinary crossing point: the Proceedings of the INHIGEO 2019 Symposium)

== See also ==
- Vladimir V. Tikhomirov History of Geology Award
