= Geological history =

Geological history may refer to:

- Historical geology, or paleogeology is a discipline that seeks to reconstruct and understand the
  - geological history of Earth, or;
- History of geology, the development of the scientific study of the origin, history, and structure of the Earth.
