= Kenneth L. Taylor =

American historian (born 1941)

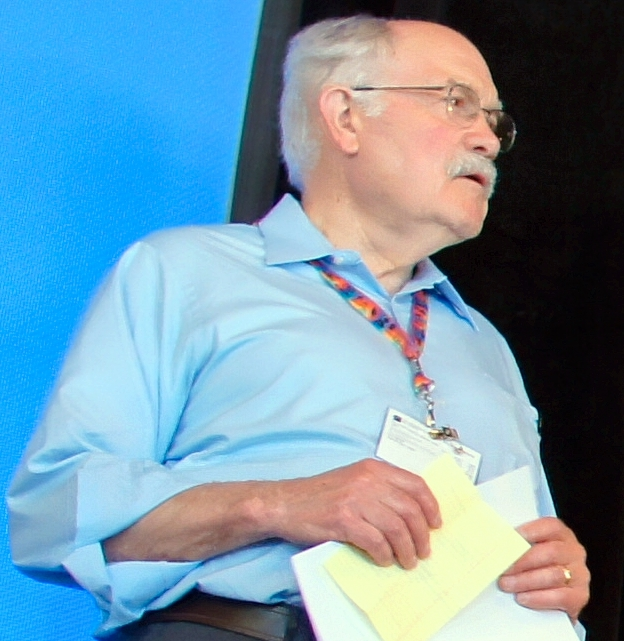
- Born: May 16, 1941 (age 85)
- Education: Harvard University (AB, AM, PhD)
- Occupation: Historian
- Awards: Sue Tyler Friedman Medal (1998); Vladimir V. Tikhomirov History of Geology Award (2024)

Kenneth L. Taylor (born May 16, 1941) is an American historian of geology.

== Education and career ==
At Harvard University, Taylor graduated in the specialty "History and Science" with three degrees: A.B. in 1962, A.M. in 1965, and Ph.D. in 1968. His doctoral advisors were I. Bernard Cohen and Everett Mendelsohn. In the department of the history of science at the University of Oklahoma, Taylor was an assistant professor from 1967 to 1972, an associate professor from 1972 to 1986, and a full professor from 1986 to 2006, when he retired as professor emeritus. He chaired his department for 14 years, from 1979 to 1992, and acted as interim chair in autumn 1978 and spring 1999.

Taylor was for the academic year 1973–1974 a postdoctoral fellow, supported by the CNRS and the NSF, at the Centre Alexandre Koyré in Paris. He was from 1990 to 1991 a Dibner Visiting Historian of Science. In 2001 he held the position Directeur d’Études Associé at the École des Hautes Études en Sciences Sociales in Paris.

He has written numerous articles and essay reviews. Several of his papers on the history of French geology and science during the Age of Enlightenment are recognized as classics. Taylor's essay The Beginnings of a French Geological Identity (1980) presents evidence that, in the years from 1750 to 1800, naturalists tended to reject large syntheses or theoretical systems of natural history and geology and to strongly favor field observations. His essay Before volcanoes became ordinary (2016) points out that ancient Greek and Latin literature had no generic terms for volcanoes and gives an overview of how perceptions about volcanoes have changed over the past two millennia.

Taylor has served in various capacities in several organizations. From 1990 to 1993 he chaired the U.S. National Committee on the History of Geology of the National Academy of Sciences. From 2005 to 2007 he was a consulting editor for the New Dictionary of Scientific Biography. From 2012 to 2016 he was the president of the International Commission on the History of Geological Sciences (INHIGEO).

He was elected in 1997 a Fellow of the Geological Society of America. He received in 1998 the Sue Tyler Friedman Medal from the Geological Society of London, in 2007 the Mary C. Rabbitt History of Geology Award from the Geological Society of America, and in 2018 the Prix Wegmann from the Société Géologique de France.

== Selected publications ==
=== Articles ===
- Schneer, Cecil J., ed. (1979). "Geology in 1776: Some notes on the character of an incipient science by K. L. Taylor". Two Hundred Years of Geology in America: Proceedings of the New Hampshire Bicentennial Conference on the History of Geology. Hanover, New Hampshire: University Press of New England. pp. 75–90. ISBN 0-87451-160-7.
- Taylor, K. L. "The Beginnings of a French Geological Identity". Histoire et Nature: 65–82. No. 19–20 (1981–82) (Le développement de la géologie de langue française dans ses relations internationales des origines à la mort de Cuvier (1832), Actes, Symposium in history of geology, 26th International Geological Congress, held 7 to 17 July 1980 in Paris)
- Taylor, K. L. (1985). "Early Geoscience Mapping, 1700–1830". Proceedings of the Geoscience Information Society. XV: 15–49.
- Taylor, K. L. (1988). "Les Lois naturelles dans la géologie du XVIIIème siècle: Recherches préliminaires". Travaux du Comité Français d'Histoire de la Géologie. 3ème série. 2 (1): 1–28.
- Taylor, Kenneth L. (1994). "New light on geological mapping in Auvergne during the eighteenth century: The Pasumot-Desmarest collaboration". Revue d'Histoire des Sciences. 47 (1): 129–136. doi:10.3406/rhs.1994.1195. JSTOR 23633476.
- Taylor, Kenneth (1998). "Earth and Heaven, 1750-1800: Enlightenment Ideas About the Relevance to Geology of Extraterrestrial Operations and Events". Earth Sciences History. 17 (2): 84–91. Bibcode:1998ESHis..17...84T. doi:10.17704/eshi.17.2.14010xt74738ut13.
- Taylor, Kenneth L. (2001). "Buffon, Desmarest and the ordering of geological events in époques". Geological Society, London, Special Publications. 190 (1): 39–49. Bibcode:2001GSLSP.190...39T. doi:10.1144/gsl.sp.2001.190.01.04. S2CID 129491988.
- Taylor, K. L. (2006). "Marivetz, Goussier, and Planet Earth: A Late Enlightenment Geo-Physical Project". Centaurus. 48 (4): 258–283. Bibcode:2006Cent...48..258T. doi:10.1111/j.1600-0498.2006.00050.x.
- Taylor, K. L. (2007). "Geological travellers in Auvergne, 1751–1800". Geological Society, London, Special Publications. 287 (1): 73–96. Bibcode:2007GSLSP.287...73T. doi:10.1144/sp287.7. S2CID 130795117.
- Taylor, Kenneth L. (2009). "Desmarest's determination of some epochs of nature through volcanic products (1775/1779)". Episodes. 32 (2): 114–124. doi:10.18814/epiiugs/2009/v32i2/004. S2CID 129808925.
- Taylor, Kenneth L. (2017). "Before volcanoes became ordinary". Geological Society, London, Special Publications. 442 (1): 117–126. Bibcode:2017GSLSP.442..117T. doi:10.1144/sp442.27. S2CID 133083813.
- Johnston, Mike R.; Taylor, Kenneth L. (2017). "Historians of geology in the field: A half-century of INHIGEO excursions by Mike R. Johnston and Kenneth L. Taylor". In Mayer, W.; Clary, R. M.; Azuela, L. F.; Mota, T. S.; Wołkowicz, S. (eds.). History of Geoscience: Celebrating 50 Years of INHIGEO. Geological Society Special Publications 442. Vol. 442. Geological Society of London. pp. 41–54. Bibcode:2017GSLSP.442...41J. doi:10.1144/sp442.17. ISBN 978-1-78620-269-7. S2CID 133373361. (online publication July 2016)

=== Books ===
- Taylor, Kenneth L. (2008). The Earth Sciences in the Enlightenment: Studies on the Early Development of Geology. Variorum Collected Studies Series. Ashgate, England; Burlington, Vermont: Ashgate Publishing. ISBN 9780754659303. LCCN 2007022385. OCLC 145378888. book description at routledge.com
- Rappaport, Rhoda (2011). Taylor, Kenneth L.; Rudwick, Martin J. S. (eds.). Studies on eighteenth-century geology. Variorum Collected Studies Series. Farnham, Surrey, England: Ashgate Publishing. ISBN 978-1409429593. LCCN 2011930084. OCLC 751804935.

== Links ==
- Longtime OU Professor to Receive International Award in Geology History (2024).
