= Luga =

Luga may refer to:

- Mateo Noriel Luga, Ibanag revolutionary
- Luga, Germany, a place in Saxony, Germany
- Luga, Russia, several inhabited localities in Russia
- Luga Bay, a bay in the Gulf of Finland, Russia
- Luga (river), a river in Novgorod and Leningrad Oblasts, Russia
- Luga language, alternative name of the Lungga language, a Malayo-Polynesian language spoken in the Solomon Islands
- 21919 Luga, a main-belt asteroid
- Luga (crater), a crater on Mars

== See also ==
- Luzhsky (disambiguation)
