= Russian State Geological Prospecting University =

Russian State University for Geological Prospecting (MGRI)
- Российский государственный геологоразведочный университет (МГРИ)
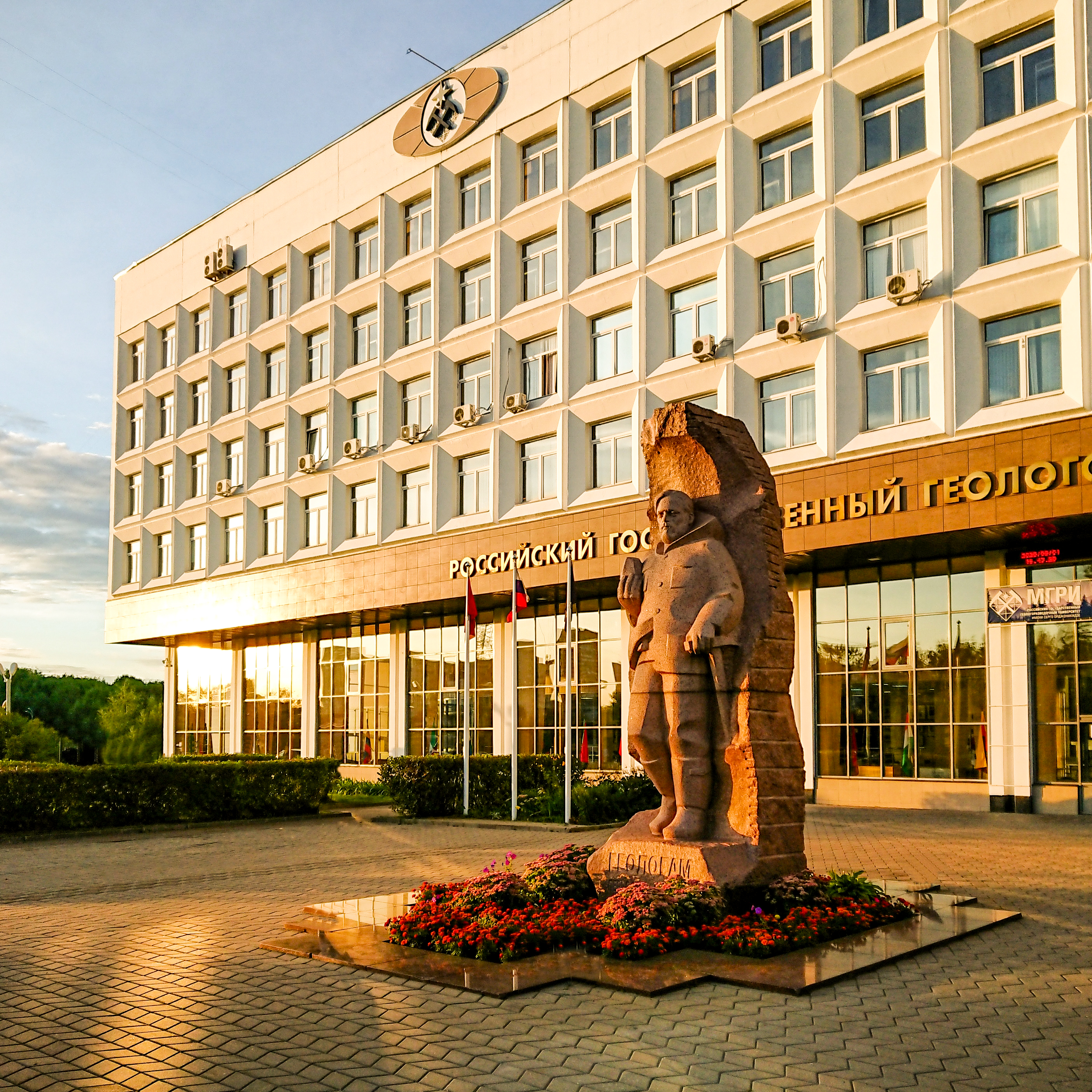
- Motto: Mente et Malleo (умом и молотком), by mind and by hammer
- Type: Public
- Established: 17 April 1930
- Rector: Kosyanov Vadim Alexandrovich
- Faculty: 328
- Students: 6647 (including the branch in Stary Oskol)
- Postgraduates: 1,000
- Other students: 20.7% (2020) total percentage of international students
- Location: Miklukho-Maklaya Street, 23, 117997, Moscow, Russia, Moscow, Russia; 55.6497°N 37.5131°E
- Campus: Urban
- Colors: Blue, dark-blue, white
- Mascot: Bear
- Website: mgri.ru

University rankings

Regional – Overall
- QS Emerging Europe and Central Asia: 251-300 (2022)

Sergo Ordzhonikidze Russian State University for Geological Prospecting (Russian: Российский государственный геологоразведочный университет, МГРИ), or the Russian State University for Geological Prospecting is named after Sergo Ordzhonikidze and previously known as the Moscow Geological Prospecting Institute, is a public university based in Moscow, Russia, specialising in geology, geophysics, gemmology, ecology and other earth-science disciplines.

There was a task in the USSR to prepare 435,000 engineers and technicians in five years (1930-1935) during the USSR industrialization period, while their number in 1929 was 66,000.

In 1930 the Moscow Mining Academy was divided into six independent institutes by the order of Supreme Soviet of the National Economy. Among the new colleges which grew out of the Academy's departments was Moscow Geological Prospecting Institute (Russian: Московский геологоразведочный институт).

Over the entire history of MGRI, the university raised more than 30,000 specialists, 1,500 candidates and 400 doctors of sciences. More than 1,300 foreigners from over 78 countries of the world are among the graduates of Russian State University of Geological Prospecting.

University graduates are the discoverers of more than two hundred large mineral deposits both in the Russian Federation and abroad. There is one mineral named after university as Mgriite (Cu_{3}AsSe_{3}). Lots of other minerals as well as geographic and geological objects and about 280 species of fossils of flora and fauna are named after graduates(professors and geologists) of MGRI. About 15 graduates of MGRI were elected academicians of the USSR Academy of Sciences(now the Russian Academy of Sciences) and 12 people were elected as corresponding members. Professors have been working on the set of "Construction Norms and Regulations" for engineering and geological spheres in Commonwealth of Independent States(CIS) and in Latin America. For more than 100 years of history, the university has developed scientific and pedagogical schools in almost all areas of the Earth Sciences. Graduates of MGRI have made a significant contribution to the development of the geological prospecting and mining industries internationally.

== Faculties ==
The institute moved to a new campus in southwestern area of Moscow in 1987 and was given state accreditation in 2007. The university has six faculties:

- Geological Prospecting Faculty
- Faculty of Geology and Geophysics of Oil and Gas
- Hydrogeological Faculty
- Faculty of Engineering, Prospecting and Mining
- Ecological Faculty
- Faculty of Economics and Management

== List of programmes ==
The university offers the following courses and undergraduate, graduate and post-graduate programmes related to geosciences:

== Bachelor's degree ==
It is a four-year undergraduate programme with a variety of 27 study programmes:

Geology

- Hydrogeology and engineering geology

Applied Geology

- Geological survey, searching and prospecting for solid mineral deposits
- Groundwater exploration and geological engineering
- Applied geochemistry, petrology, mineralogy
- Geology of oil and gas

Technologies of Geological Survey

- Geophysical methods of prospecting and exploration of mineral deposits
- Geophysical methods of the investigation of bore-wells
- Geophysical information systems
- Technology and techniques of prospecting for mineral deposits

Mining Engineering

- Underground mining of ore deposits
- Mine Surveying
- Open-pit mining
- Mining machines and equipment
- Mine and underground construction

Physical Processes of Mining and Oil and Gas Recovery

- Physical processes of mining

Ecology and Natural Resource Management

- Geoecology

Oil and Gas Engineering

- Drilling of oil and gas wells

Safety Engineering

- Environmental engineering

Technology of Artistic Processing of Metals and Minerals

- Technology for processing precious stones and metals

Overland Transport Technological Complexes

- Mining transportation equipment

Applied Informatics

- Applied geoinformatics

Information Systems and Technologies

- Information Systems and Technologies

Civil Engineering

- Water supply engineering and sanitation engineering

Economics

- Economy of enterprises

Management

- Production management

Human Resource Management

- Human Resource Management

== Master's degree ==
It is a two-year postbaccaleture program with a variety of 13 master's study programmes.

Applied Mathematics

- Mathematical modeling and processing of geological and geophysical information

Geology

- Geology and exploration of strategic types of minerals
- Hydrogeology and engineering geology
- Computer technologies for processing and interpretation of geophysical data

Ecology and Natural Resource Management

- Ecology and natural resource management

Civil Engineering

- Water treatment

Safety Engineering

- Technosphere safety in the oil and gas industry

Oil and Gas Engineering

- Construction of deep oil and gas wells in difficult mining and geological conditions
- Resource-saving technologies in drilling
- Geology, prospecting for and assessment of hydrocarbon reserves

Technology of Artistic Processing of Metals and Minerals

- Technology for processing precious stones and metals

Economics

- Economy of Enterprises

Management

- Project and program management

== Specialist degree programmes ==
Specialist diplomas (five-year programme) with a variety of five specialist degree programmes.

=== Applied Geology ===
- Geological survey, searching and prospecting for solid mineral deposits
- Groundwater exploration and geological engineering
- Applied geochemistry, petrology, mineralogy
- Geology of oil and gas

== Doctoral degree programmes ==
Is Ph.D. and post-doctoral research with a variety of 9 doctoral degree programmes.

Earth sciences

- Paleontology and stratigraphy
- Geology, exploration and prospecting for oil and gas deposits
- Engineering geology, permafrost, soil studies
- Geophysical Methods in Prospecting
- Geology, exploration and prospecting for solid minerals
- Geoecology

Geology, Prospecting and Exploration of Mineral Deposits

- Exploration techniques and technology
- Geotechnology (underground geotechnology, open geotechnology, construction geotechnology)

Economics

- Economics, organization and management of enterprises

== Rankings ==
Times Higher Education Impact (ТНЕ): 801-1000th place

Academic Ranking of World Universities-European Standard ARES-2020: ВВВ+ (80th place)

UI Greenmetrics: 540th place

IAAR Eurasian University Ranking 2020 (IAAR-EUR): TOP-10 (9th place)

Interfax's National Ranking: 127-130th place

LiftUp Rating: 17-24th place

Green Universities of Russia Ranking: TOP-40

Russian Ministry of Science and Higher Education Ranking — University Media Ranking 2021: 109th place

== MGRI Housing ==
MGRI has one 14-floor dormitory building on campus. The dormitory itself creating a living environment with a sense of community and nurtures educational experiences and personal development of students. There are several types of accommodation including superior rooms, single rooms or traditional rooms. More than 1300 students lives among themselves in a "blocks" in a double- and triple- rooms with a shared bathroom. Each floor has a community kitchen with the amenities and basic equipment for cooking and cleaning. in the dormitory students can do laundry for free during its open hours and buy food or household items at small convenience store located inside the building.

MGRI housing offers a list of amenities in every room, including:

- Basic furniture (beds, chairs, tables and a closet)
- Wireless Internet
- Cable Access in rooms
- Storage Unit Rentals

At the first floor there is a security checkpoint and a front desk with residential policies stands. On the first floor there are also housing administration offices.

== Student life ==
=== Council of Students ===
This student organization (known as "OSO") is a useful tool for connecting MGRI students with all the events, resources and student clubs on campus.

Everyone has a right to start a club and have a mentor from academic staff. OSO helps students solving issues in student and academic life, explore campus resources and opportunities available for students.

=== Council of International Students ===
For foreign students it is common to join Council of International Students ( known as "SIO"). It was created to let students participate in the management of educational process and to have support solving issues with visa documentation and academic life. The SIO developing social activity and implementing student initiatives. SIO launched an "Interclub MGRINT" where students write and perform theatre plays in English.

Currently there are several biggest student clubs on campus:

=== Outdoors club ===
Club has an aim to spread and cultivate awareness and responsibility of tourist expeditions and field trips. This student club has workshops, gatherings and expeditions related to culture, hikes and travelling in Russia and abroad. Experienced students teach newbies an important skills of living in wilderness such as placing a bonfire, set up tents and identify edible food in nature as an outdoor activist. These useful skills are good for geologists and geoscientists who often work in long-term field trips far away from inhabited places.

=== Ecology club ===
Eco-club empower students to participate and take up meaningful environmental activities and projects. The purpose of Ecology Club is to build a community of like-minded, diverse individuals who are interested in ecology, evolution, zoology, botany, and/or anything else dealing with life and the outdoors. Students participate in festivals and grant programmes related to major ecological problems that world faces now.

=== Media club ===
Media club raising influencers in alma-mater. Participants of the club are irreplesible in numerous social activities, events and celebrations in university. Mass media life in MGRI brings students together outside of the classroom to create multimedia productions, from producing films to recording talk-shows. The club engages students who exhibit interest and talent in photography, filming and digital art. Media clubs' journalists supporting media projects that increase students' understanding of, and proficiency in, the communication arts. Students are given the possibility to develop their skills through training programs such as video editing, short film projects, photography courses, exhibitions, field trips and media competitions. Students creating podcasts, recording on-air interviews and writing articles for the MGRIs' official website. This opportunity gives voice to the students and provides them exposure to the media and broadcast segment, as well as the responsibility for content.

=== E-sports club "Shadow" ===
This club host tournaments and train MGRI teams in different cybersport disciplines: DoTA 2, CS-Go, StarCraft 2, PUBG, League og Legends etc. "Shadow" competes in various e-sport student leagues, national tournaments and derbies.

=== Sport club "Ruby Mustang" ===
The student club works with Student Sport Club Association of Russia. Sportsmen of the university participates in football, volleyball, archery and chess national competitions.

=== Art club "OTL" ===
Organization of creative people have several branches of art spheres. In OTL students are learning how to draw, design posters and work with different drawing tools. After the basics students can continue drawing in traditional way or go into digital art. During various classes students gain oratory skills and prepare to perform in MGRI theatre.

=== MGRI Volunteering Center ===
This organization provides a list of charity companies and various events where volunteers needed. The Center organizes humanitarian aid trips to orphanages, nursing homes and animal shelters. Also it gives an opportunity to apply for volunteering in sports competition, music festivals and different forums.

== MiT ==
MiT is an association of Young Scientists and Engineers of MGRI.

The MiT has three branches: SPE student chapter, SEG student chapter and AAPG student chapter.

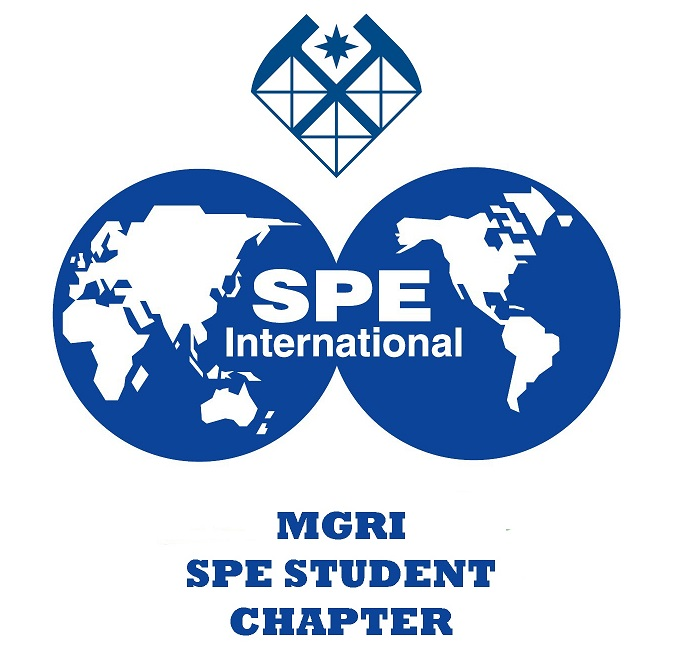

=== SPE ===
MGRI has a membership in the Society of Petroleum Engineers. It is the first chapter that students organized within MGRI. SPE is the largest individual-member organization serving managers, engineers, scientists and other professionals in the upstream segment of the oil and gas industry. SPE is an essential resource for obtaining and disseminating information in the field of oil and gas exploration through publications, events and training courses. Specifically, SPE manages key industry resources, including OnePetro and PetroWiki, and publishes and publishes peer-reviewed journals, books and academic articles. MGRI students host and participate in SPE conferences, seminars and other events around the world. From the early 1900s, SPE has grown into an independent, nonprofit global society with more than 140,600 members in 144 countries.

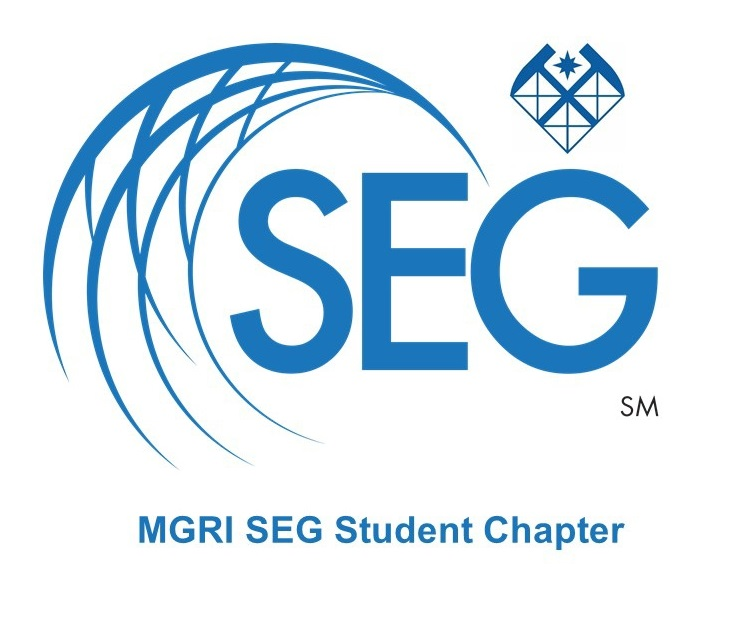

=== SEG ===
The Society of Exploration Geophysicists (SEG) is a global not-for-profit organization with a mission of connecting the world of applied geophysics. MGRI has an official chapter of SEG.

It encourages collaboration and thought leadership for the geophysical science around the world by advancement in education, professional development, new business generation for the geophysicists.

Founded in 1930, SEG provides information, tools, and resources vital to:

- Advancing the science of exploration geophysics
- Fostering common scientific interests
- Supporting humanitarian efforts
- Accelerating geophysical innovation

=== AAPG ===
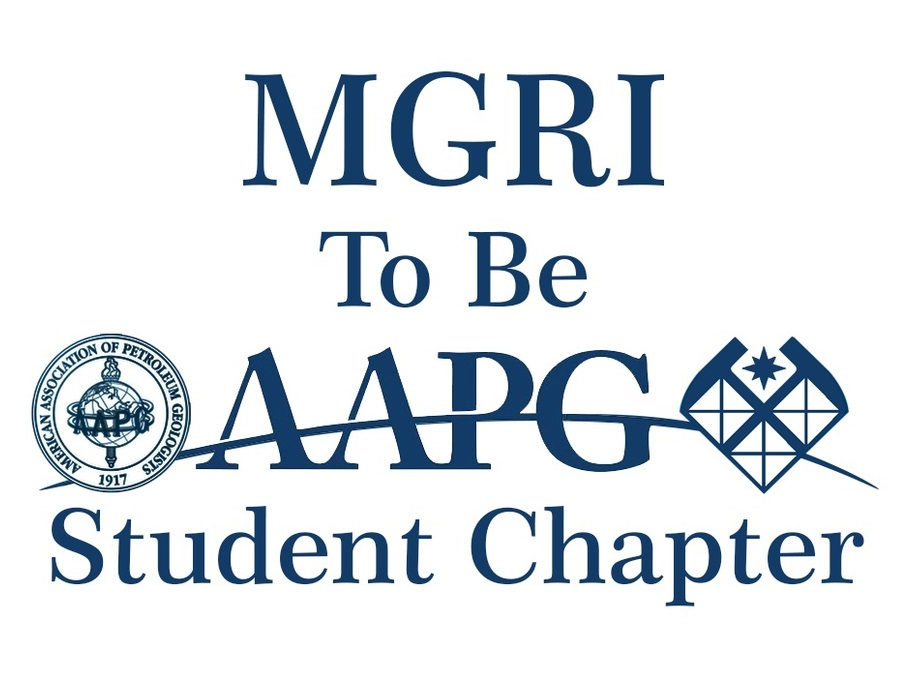

The American Association of Petroleum Geologists has been a pillar of the worldwide scientific community. The original purpose of AAPG is to foster scientific research, to advance the science of geology, to promote technology, and to inspire high professional conduct, still guides the Association today. In MGRI students have membership in this Association. They work on this platform and do publications, conferences, and receive educational opportunities from the AAPG community. This chapter provides the most current geological information available to geoscientists.

As the world's premier professional association for explorationists, AAPG is about the science of petroleum geology.

It's also about the people. AAPG's membership is made up of about 40,000 members in 129 countries in the upstream energy industry who collaborate – and compete – to provide the means for humankind to thrive. AAPG provides the network of communications that allow those professionals to succeed since 1917.

Due to the lack of accreditation this chapter has been closed in 2022.

EAGE

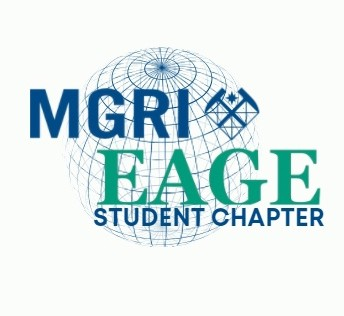

A new chapter occurred after reformation of the AAPG chapter. This structure formed official membership quickly, so the new history in MGRI science begun. The mission of the Association shall be to promote the development and application of geosciences and related engineering subjects, to promote innovation and technical progress and to foster the communication, fellowship and cooperation between those working in, studying or otherwise being interested in these fields. EAGE is one of the largest multidisciplinary geoscience organisations globally, with members active in over 110 different countries and territories.

EAGE chapter suits students in geoscience and engineering programmes who seek to start their own scientific projects.

== GeoArtek ==
"GeoArtek" is a career guidance project, which has been implemented since 2016 on the basis of the International Children's Center "ARTEK" in the Republic of Crimea. Several hundred children aged 10 to 17 from 46 regions of Russia and other countries have already taken part in the project.

During GeoArtek, young geologists are trained in methods of geological field researches, safety rules during expeditions, and acquaintance with environmental problems. Participants gain skills to work in expeditionary conditions, taking part in workshops by leading scientists and specialists in geosciences. An important aspect is that a lot of work with young geologists is carried out by MGRI students.

The GeoArtek project was awarded the honorary badge “Architect of Knowledge”, which was presented to the university by the Deputy Prime Minister of the Russian Government Olga Golodets.

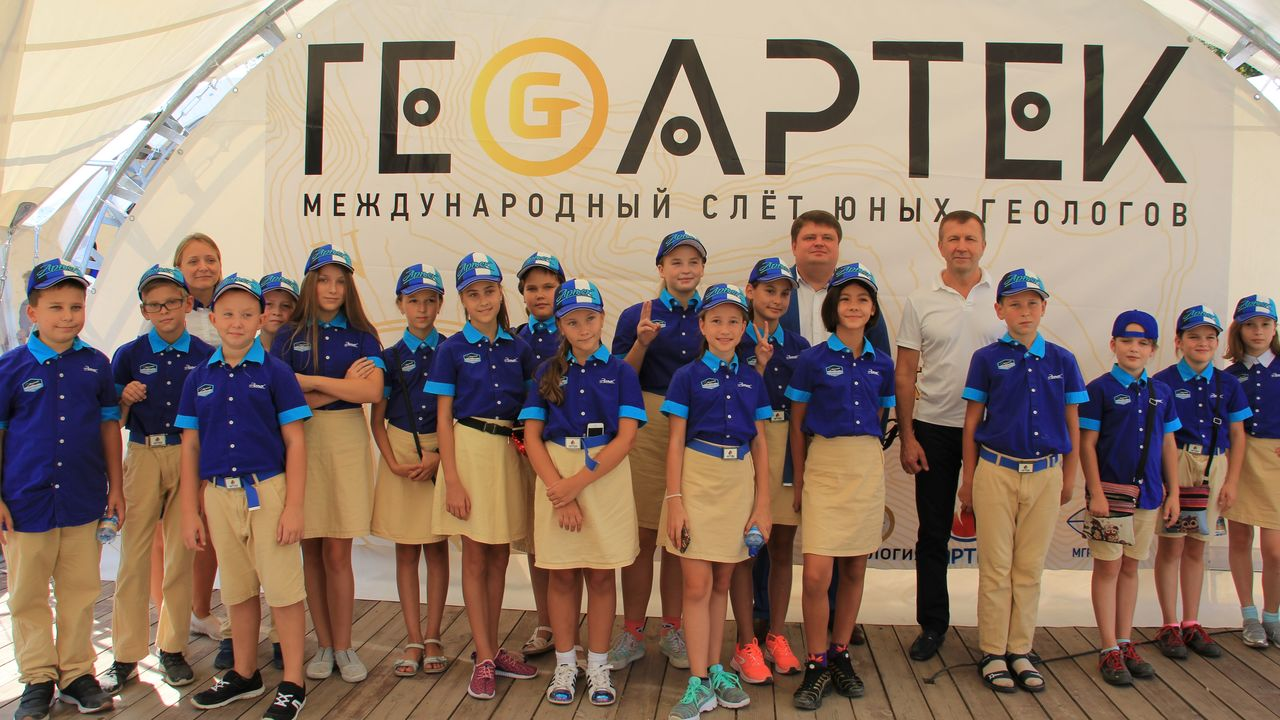
GeoArtek launch in 2019.

== Museum complex on campus ==
The educational museum complex was created on March 10, 2010.

- Mineralogical Museum

It was created in 1930 by merging the Museum of the Mining Academy with the Mineralogical Museum of Moscow University. A part of the educational exposition remained in the old building and later was rearranged to the Vernadsky State Geological Museum of the Russian Academy of Sciences;

Geological and Paleontological Museum belongs to the Regional Geology and Paleontology Department of MGRI;

- Museum of the History of MGRI.

In addition to the university, MGRI includes the branch in Staryi Oskol (SOF MGRI), as well as the Representative Office in the Republic of Crimea with a base for geological prospecting. MGRI also has base in Sergiev Posad — the campus holds educational, research and production labs for students, who specializes in geophysics, hydrogeology and drilling.
