= Luzhsky =

Luzhsky (masculine), Luzhskaya (feminine), or Luzhskoye (neuter) may refer to:

- Luzhsky District, a district of Leningrad Oblast
- Luga Okrug (Luzhsky okrug) (1927–1930), former administrative division of Leningrad Oblast, Russia
- Luzhsky Uyezd, an administrative division of St. Petersburg Governorate in the Russian Empire
- Luzhskoye Urban Settlement, a municipal formation corresponding to Luzhskoye Settlement Municipal Formation, an administrative division of Luzhsky District of Leningrad Oblast, Russia
