= Hugh Torrens =

Historian of geology (born 1940)

- Born: Hugh Simon Torrens; 1940 (age 85–86)
- Education: University of Oxford; University of Leicester
- Awards: Vladimir V. Tikhomirov History of Geology Award (2012)
- Scientific career
- Fields: History of geology and paleontology
- Workplaces: Keele University

Hugh Simon Torrens (born 1940) is a British historian of geology and paleontology, and Emeritus Professor of History of Science and Technology at Keele University.

Torrens received a bachelor's degree from the University of Oxford and a PhD from the University of Leicester.

He was president of the Society for the History of Natural History from 2012 to 2015, when he was succeeded by Arthur MacGregor.

He was awarded the Sue Tyler Friedman Medal by the Geological Society in 1991.
