= Vernadsky State Geological Museum =

Museum in Moscow, Russia

Coordinates: 55°45′22.22″N 37°36′40.55″E

The Vernadsky State Geological Museum
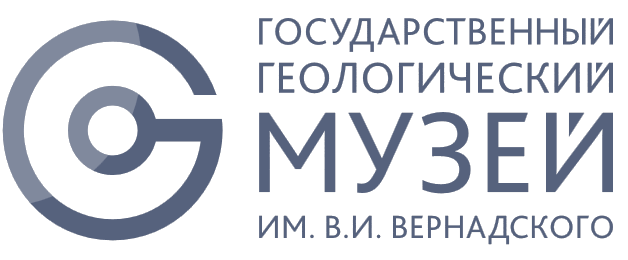

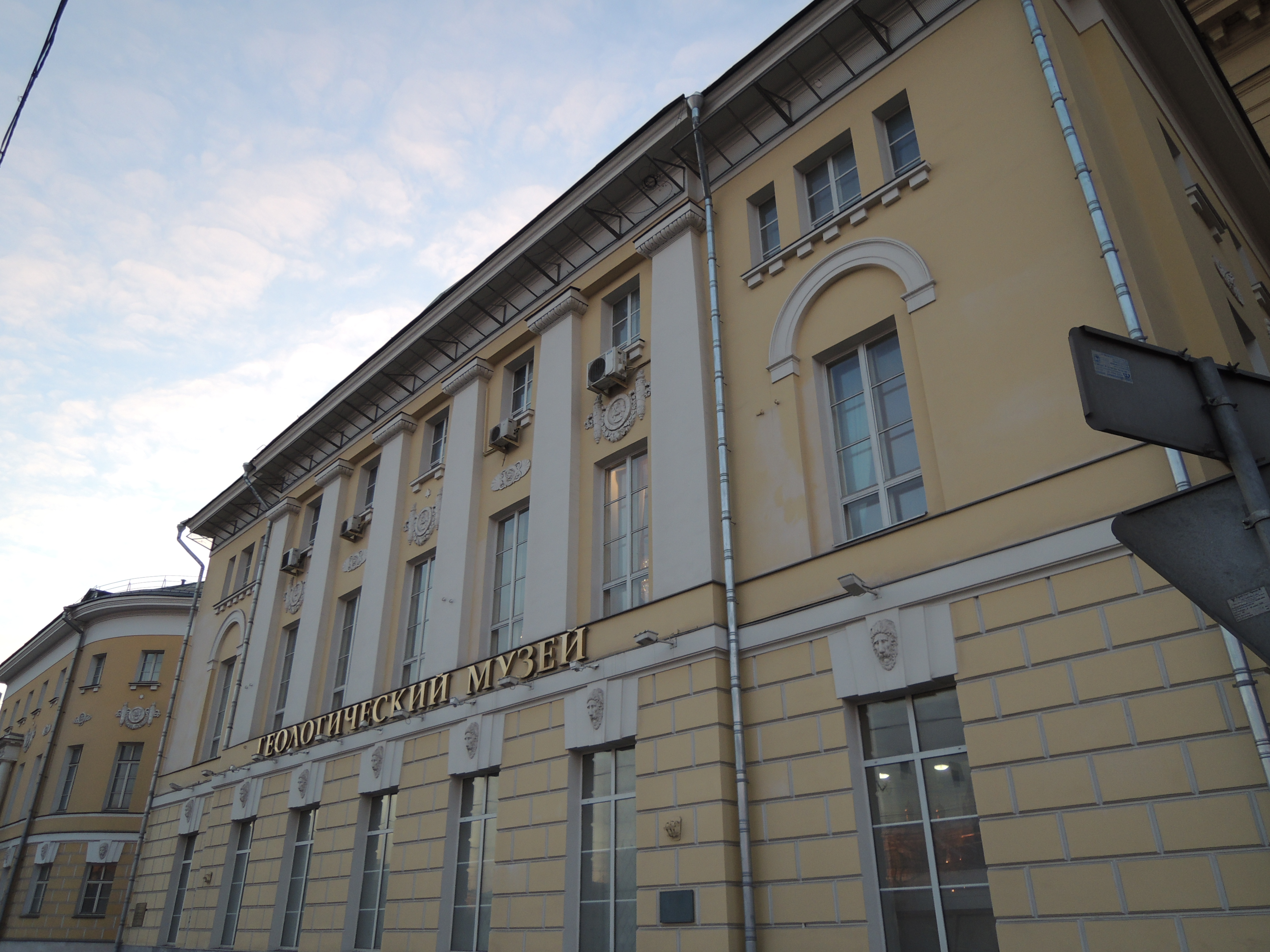
- Established: 1988
- Type: earth science and educational centre of Russian Academy of Sciences.
- Collections: minerals, rocks, fossils
- Owner: Russian Academy of Sciences
- Parking: no

The Vernadsky State Geological Museum is the geological museum in Moscow. Mineralogical collection was founded in 1755 and is now an earth sciences and educational centre of the Russian Academy of Sciences.

== History ==
Mikhail Lomonosov had studied mining principles in Germany, concluding that "it is necessary to use not only books, but objects of Nature", and it was he who came up with the principals of the charter of Moscow Imperial University, founded in January 1755, and for the founding of its mineralogical collection.
