= International Union of Geological Sciences =

International non-governmental organization

- Logo
- Abbreviation: IUGS
- Formation: 1961; 65 years ago
- Type: INGO, standards organization
- Headquarters: Founded in Paris, France, secretariat in Beijing, China
- Region served: Worldwide
- President (2024-2028): Prof. Hassina Mouri (Algerian/South African)
- Key people: Ludwig Stroink (Secretary General); David R. Cohen (Treasurer)
- Parent organization: International Science Council (ISC)
- Website: www.iugs.org

The International Union of Geological Sciences (IUGS) is an international non-governmental organization devoted to global cooperation in the field of geology. As of 2023, it represents more than 1 million geoscientists around the world.

== About ==
Founded in 1961, the IUGS was established to maintain collaboration between the International Geological Congresses, which have taken place every four years since 1875. It is a Scientific Union member of the International Science Council (ISC), formerly the International Council for Science (ICSU), which it recognizes as the co-ordinating body for the international organization of science. Currently, geologists from 121 countries (and regions) are represented in the IUGS. A broad range of scientific topics is covered by its commission, task groups, joint programmes and affiliated organizations. IUGS promotes and encourages the study of geological problems, especially those of worldwide significance, and supports and facilitates international and inter-disciplinary co-operation in the earth sciences. The Union's Secretariat is currently located at the Chinese Academy of Geological Sciences in Beijing, China.

== Activities ==
IUGS is a joint partner with UNESCO for the International Geoscience Programme (IGCP) and also participates in the Global Geoparks Network (GGN). The Geological Society of London oversees the production and distribution of IUGS Publications. The Geological Society of India produces and distributes the Union's quarterly journal, entitled Episodes, as well as providing editorial support. Interested parties can download the latest issues of Episodes free of charge. Other activities include: Resourcing Future Generations (RFG), Young Reporters, Deep-Time Digital Earth (DDE).

=== Commissions ===
IUGS runs nine international commissions, covering the following topics:

- Commission for the Management and Application of Geoscience Information (CGI)
- Commission for Geoscience Education, Training, and Technology Transfer (COGE)
- Commission on Geoscience for Environmental Management (GEM)
- International Commission on Stratigraphy (ICS)
- International Commission on the History of Geological Sciences (INHIGEO)
- Commission on Tectonics and Structural Geology (TECTASK)
- Commission on Global Geochemical Baselines (CGGB)
- Commission on Geoethics (CG)
- International Commission on Geoheritage (ICG)

Soviet square pin commemorates the 27th International Geological Congress, held in Moscow (МОСКВА), USSR (СССР), in 1984. The Latin motto “Mente et malleo” means “With mind and hammer,” combining intellectual inquiry with practical geological fieldwork.

=== International Geological Congress ===
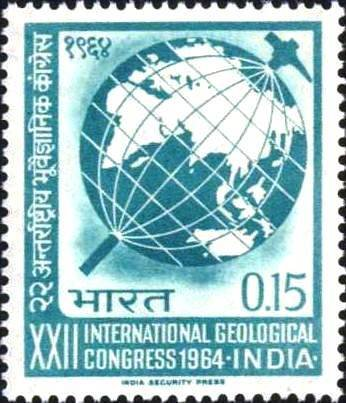
Stamp of India released on the eve of 22nd International Geological Congress in 1964

The International Union of Geological Sciences is the main scientific sponsor of the International Geological Congress (IGC), which takes place every four years. The first congress was in France in 1878 where a few geoscientists gathered to share new finds with the aim to create a framework and a platform for geoscientists to meet at regular intervals. The event has been growing bigger with each congress.

Brisbane hosted the 34th congress in August 2012 and Cape Town the 35th in 2016. Delhi was to host the 36th in March 2020 as a collaborative effort by Bangladesh, India, Nepal, Pakistan and Sri Lanka. Because of COVID, the congress was postponed twice and developed online in 2021. The 37th was held in August 2024 in Busan. Canada won the bid to host the 38th IGC in Calgary in 2028.

=== Lists of IUGS geological heritage sites ===
To celebrate the sixtieth anniversary of its establishment, in 2022, IUGS published a list of 100 sites around the world that it holds to be significant in the development of the earth sciences.

In 2024, IUGS published a second list of another 100 geological heritage sites.

=== List of IUGS geo-collections of global importance ===
In 2024, the IUGS ratified eleven geo-collections. An IUGS Geo-collection "is a museum collection or part of a museum collection of global importance because of its particularly high scientific, historical or educational relevance for geological sciences". A call for nominations for further geo-collections was made in October, 2025.

== Awards ==
The IUGS Scientific Awards of Excellence:

- IUGS – Émile Argand Award
- IUGS – James M. Harrison Award
- IUGS – Award for Geoscience Information
- IUGS – Award for Structural Geology
- Vladimir V. Tikhomirov History of Geology Medal by the IUGS Commission on the History of Geology (INHIGEO).
- Digby McLaren Medal by the IUGS Commission on Stratigraphy (ICS).

== See also ==
- International Union of Geodesy and Geophysics
- International Union for Quaternary Research
- International Union of Soil Sciences
- QAPF diagram
