= History of geology =

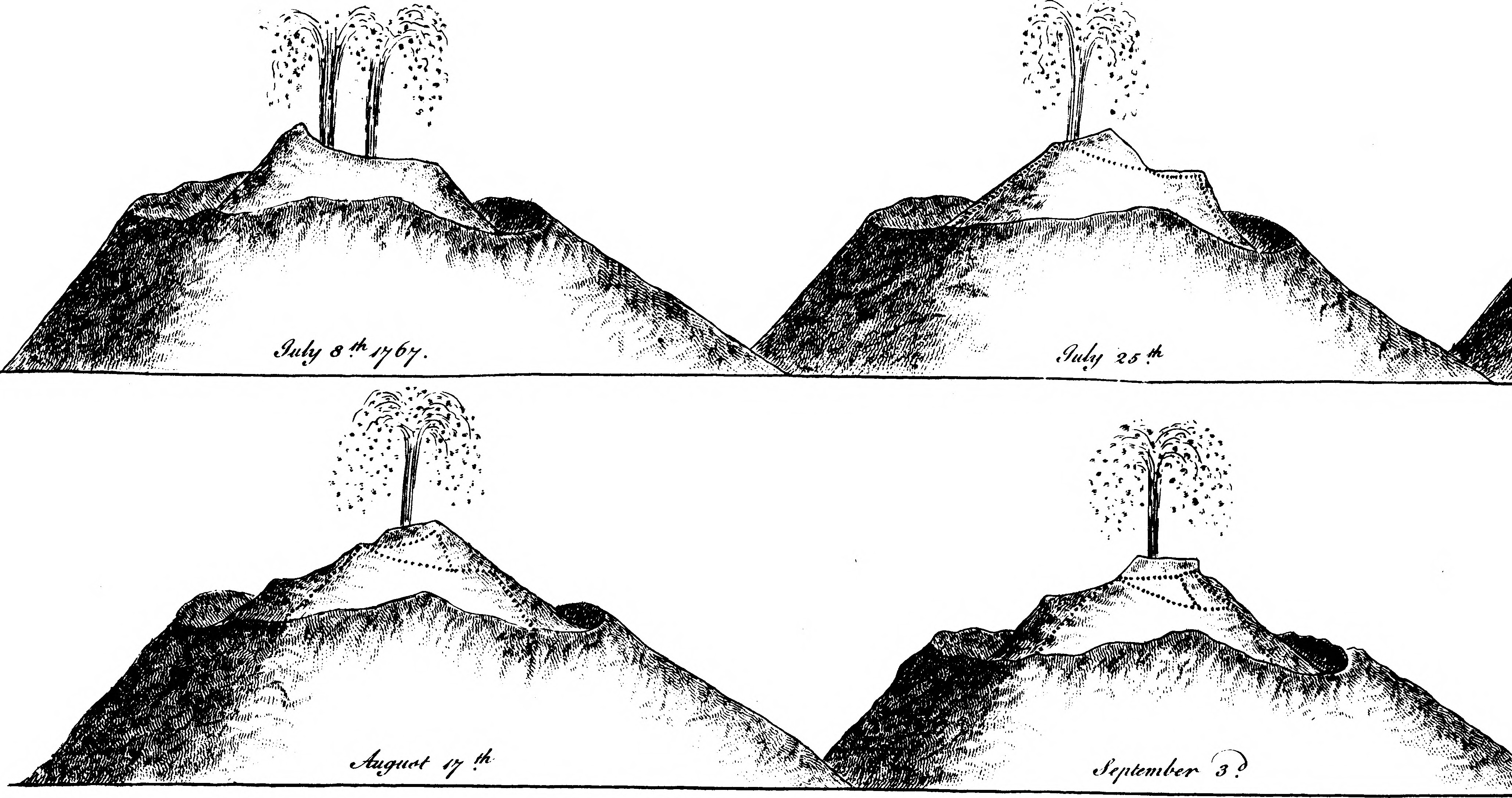
Illustration from a 1767 account by William Hamilton of a volcanic eruption of Mount Vesuvius

The history of geology is concerned with the development of the natural science of geology. Geology is the scientific study of the origin, history, and structure of the Earth.

== Antiquity ==
In the year 540 BC, Xenophanes described fossil fish and shells found in deposits on mountains. Similar fossils were noted by Herodotus (about 490 BC).

Some of the first geological thoughts were about the origin of the Earth. Ancient Greece developed some primary geological concepts concerning the origin of the Earth. Additionally, in the 4th century BC Aristotle made critical observations of the slow rate of geological change. He observed the composition of the land and formulated a theory where the Earth changes at a slow rate and that these changes cannot be observed during one person's lifetime. Aristotle developed one of the first evidence-based concepts connected to the geological realm regarding the rate at which the Earth physically changes.

However, it was his successor at the Lyceum, the philosopher Theophrastus, who made the greatest progress in antiquity in his work On Stones. He described many minerals and ores both from local mines such as those at Laurium near Athens, and further afield. He also quite naturally discussed types of marble and building materials like limestones, and attempted a primitive classification of the properties of minerals by their properties such as hardness.

Much later in the Roman period, Pliny the Elder produced a very extensive discussion of many more minerals and metals then widely used for practical ends. He was among the first to correctly identify the origin of amber as a fossilized resin from trees by the observation of insects trapped within some pieces. He also laid the basis of crystallography by recognising the octahedral habit of diamond.

== Middle Ages ==
Abu al-Rayhan al-Biruni (AD 973–1048) was one of the earliest Muslim geologists, whose works included the earliest writings on the geology of India, hypothesizing that the Indian subcontinent was once a sea.

Ibn Sina (Avicenna, AD 981–1037), a Persian polymath, made significant contributions to geology and the natural sciences (which he called Attabieyat) along with other natural philosophers such as Ikhwan AI-Safa and many others. Ibn Sina wrote an encyclopedic work entitled "Kitab al-Shifa" (the Book of Cure, Healing or Remedy from ignorance), in which Part 2, Section 5, contains his commentary on Aristotle's Mineralogy and Meteorology, in six chapters: Formation of mountains, The advantages of mountains in the formation of clouds; Sources of water; Origin of earthquakes; Formation of minerals; The diversity of the Earth's terrain.

In medieval China, one of the most intriguing naturalists was Shen Kuo (1031–1095), a polymath personality who dabbled in many fields of study in his age. In terms of geology, Shen Kuo is one of the first naturalists to have formulated a theory of geomorphology. This was based on his observations of sedimentary uplift, soil erosion, deposition of silt, and marine fossils found in the Taihang Mountains, located hundreds of miles from the Pacific Ocean. He also formulated a theory of gradual climate change, after his observation of ancient petrified bamboos found in a preserved state underground near Yanzhou (modern Yan'an), in the dry northern climate of Shaanxi province. He formulated a hypothesis for the process of land formation: based on his observation of fossil shells in a geological stratum in a mountain hundreds of miles from the ocean, he inferred that the land was formed by erosion of the mountains and by deposition of silt.

== 17th century ==
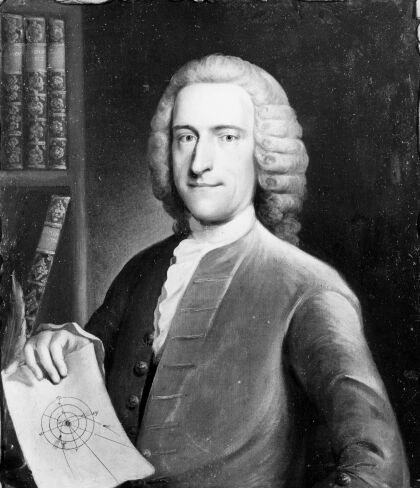
A portrait of Whiston with a diagram demonstrating his theories of cometary catastrophism best described in A New Theory of the Earth

It was not until the 17th century that geology made great strides in its development. At this time, geology became its own entity in the world of natural science. It was discovered by the Christian world that different translations of the Bible contained different versions of the biblical text. The one entity that remained consistent through all of the interpretations was that the Deluge had formed the world's geology and geography. To prove the Bible's authenticity, individuals felt the need to demonstrate with scientific evidence that the Great Flood had in fact occurred. With this enhanced desire for data came an increase in observations of the Earth's composition, which in turn led to the discovery of fossils.

In 1687, in his Principia, the mathematician and physicist Isaac Newton was the first to calculate the age of Earth by experiment, based on a globe of iron cooling equal to Earth in size, at 50,000 years old.

Although theories that resulted from the heightened interest in the Earth's composition were often manipulated to support the concept of the Deluge, a genuine outcome was a greater interest in the makeup of the Earth. Due to the strength of Christian beliefs during the 17th century, the theory of the origin of the Earth that was most widely accepted was A New Theory of the Earth published in 1696, by William Whiston. Whiston used Christian reasoning to "prove" that the Great Flood had occurred and that the flood had formed the rock strata of the Earth.

During the 17th century, both religious and scientific speculation about the Earth's origin further propelled interest in the Earth and brought about more systematic identification techniques of the Earth's strata. The Earth's strata can be defined as horizontal layers of rock having approximately the same composition throughout. An important pioneer in the science was Nicolas Steno. Steno was trained in the classical texts on science; however, by 1659 he seriously questioned accepted knowledge of the natural world. Importantly, he questioned the idea that fossils grew in the ground, as well as common explanations of rock formation. His investigations and his subsequent conclusions on these topics have led scholars to consider him one of the founders of modern stratigraphy and geology (Steno, who became a Catholic as an adult, was eventually made a bishop, and was beatified in 1988 by Pope John Paul II. Therefore, he is also called Blessed Nicolas Steno).

== 18th century ==
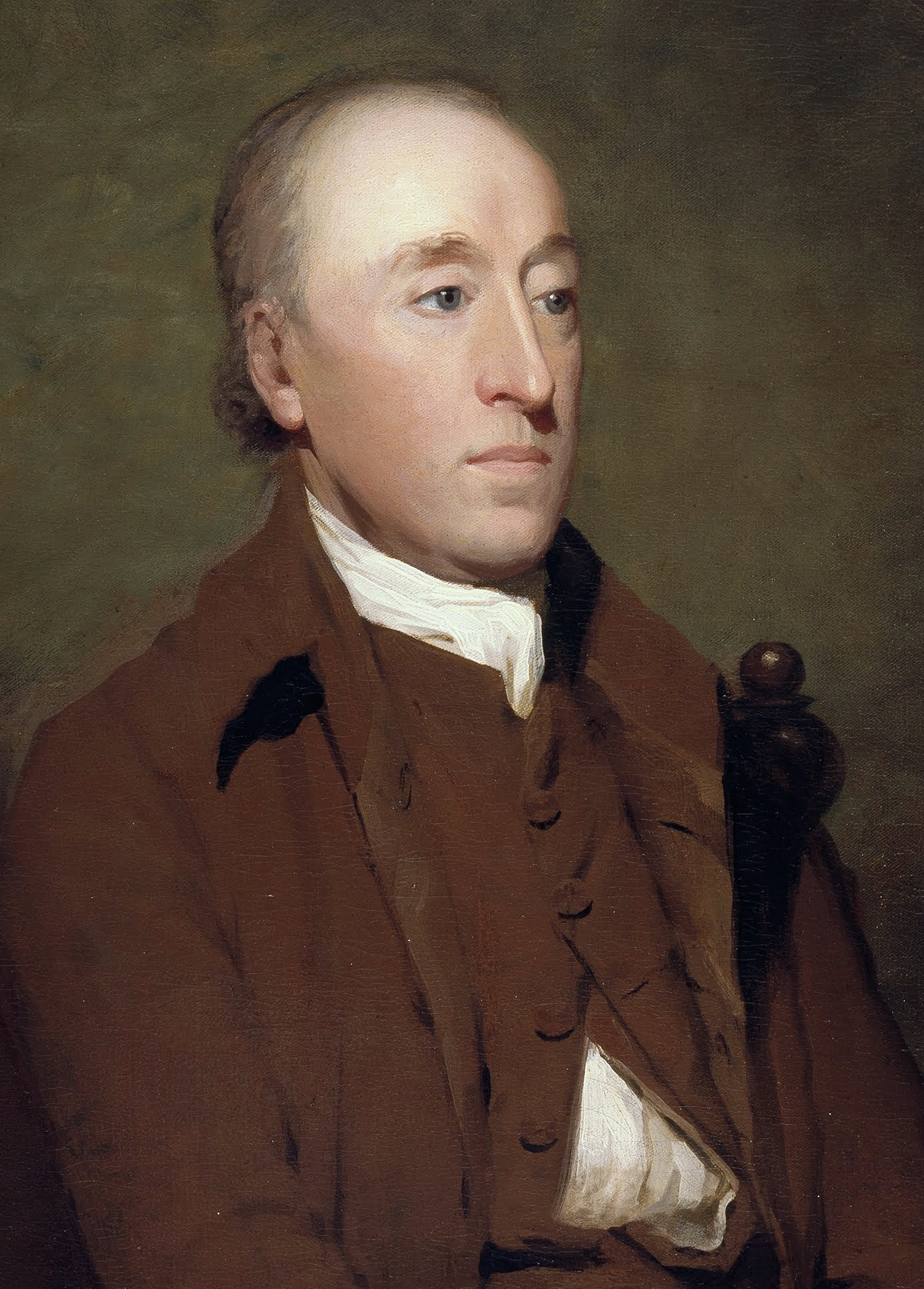
Scotsman James Hutton is considered to be the father of modern geology.

From this increased interest in the nature of the Earth and its origin, came a heightened attention to minerals and other components of the Earth's crust. Moreover, the increasing economic importance of mining in Europe during the mid to late 18th century made the possession of accurate knowledge about ores and their natural distribution vital. Scholars began to study the makeup of the Earth in a systematic manner, with detailed comparisons and descriptions not only of the land itself, but of the semi-precious metals it contained, which had great commercial value. For example, in 1774 Abraham Gottlob Werner published the book Von den äusserlichen Kennzeichen der Fossilien (On the External Features of Fossils), which brought him widespread recognition because he presented a detailed system for identifying specific minerals based on external characteristics. The more efficiently productive land for mining could be identified and the semi-precious metals could be found, the more money could be made. This drive for economic gain propelled geology into the limelight and made it a popular subject to pursue. With an increased number of people studying it, came more detailed observations and more information about the Earth.

Also during the eighteenth century, aspects of the history of the Earth – namely the divergences between the accepted religious concept and factual evidence – once again became a popular topic for discussion in society. In 1749, the French naturalist Georges-Louis Leclerc, Comte de Buffon published his Histoire Naturelle, in which he attacked the popular Biblical accounts given by Whiston and other ecclesiastical theorists of the history of the Earth. From experimentation with cooling globes, he found that the age of the Earth was not only 4,000 or 5,500 years as inferred from the Bible, but rather 75,000 years.

Another individual who described the history of the Earth with reference to neither God nor the Bible was the philosopher Immanuel Kant, who published his Universal Natural History and Theory of the Heavens (Allgemeine Naturgeschichte und Theorie des Himmels) in 1755. From the works of these respected men, as well as others, it became acceptable by the mid eighteenth century to question the age of the Earth. This questioning represented a turning point in the study of the Earth. It was now possible to study the history of the Earth from a scientific perspective without religious preconceptions.

With the application of scientific methods to the investigation of the Earth's history, the study of geology could become a distinct field of science. To begin with, the terminology and definition of what constituted geological study had to be worked out. The term "geology" was first used technically in publications by two Genevan naturalists, Jean-André Deluc and Horace-Bénédict de Saussure, though "geology" was not well received as a term until it was taken up in the very influential compendium, the Encyclopédie, published beginning in 1751 by Denis Diderot.

Once the term was established to denote the study of the Earth and its history, geology slowly became more generally recognized as a distinct science that could be taught as a field of study at educational institutions. In 1741 the best-known institution in the field of natural history, the National Museum of Natural History in France, created the first teaching position designated specifically for geology. This was an important step in further promoting knowledge of geology as a science and in recognizing the value of widely disseminating such knowledge.

By the 1770s, chemistry was starting to play a pivotal role in the theoretical foundation of geology and two opposite theories with committed followers emerged. These contrasting theories offered differing explanations of how the rock layers of the Earth's surface had formed. One suggested that a liquid inundation, perhaps like the biblical deluge, had created all geological strata. The theory extended chemical theories that had been developing since the seventeenth century and was promoted by Scotland's John Walker, Sweden's Johan Gottschalk Wallerius and Germany's Abraham Werner. Of these names, Werner's views become internationally influential around 1800. He argued that the Earth's layers, including basalt and granite, had formed as a precipitate from an ocean that covered the entire Earth. Werner's system was influential and those who accepted his theory were known as Diluvianists or Neptunists. The Neptunist thesis was the most popular during the late eighteenth century, especially for those who were chemically trained.

However, another thesis slowly gained currency from the 1780s forward. Instead of water, some mid-eighteenth-century naturalists such as Buffon had suggested that strata had been formed through heat (or fire). Abbé Anton Moro, who had studied volcanic islands, first proposed the theory before 1750, and James Hutton subsequently developed it as part of his Theory of the Earth. Hutton argued against the theory of Neptunism, proposing instead the theory of based on heat. Those who followed this thesis during the early nineteenth century referred to this view as Plutonism: the formation of the Earth through the gradual solidification of a molten mass at a slow rate by the same processes that had occurred throughout history and continued in the present day. This led him to the conclusion that the Earth was immeasurably old and could not possibly be explained within the limits of the chronology inferred from the Bible. Plutonists believed that volcanic processes were the chief agent in rock formation, not water from a Great Flood.

== 19th century ==
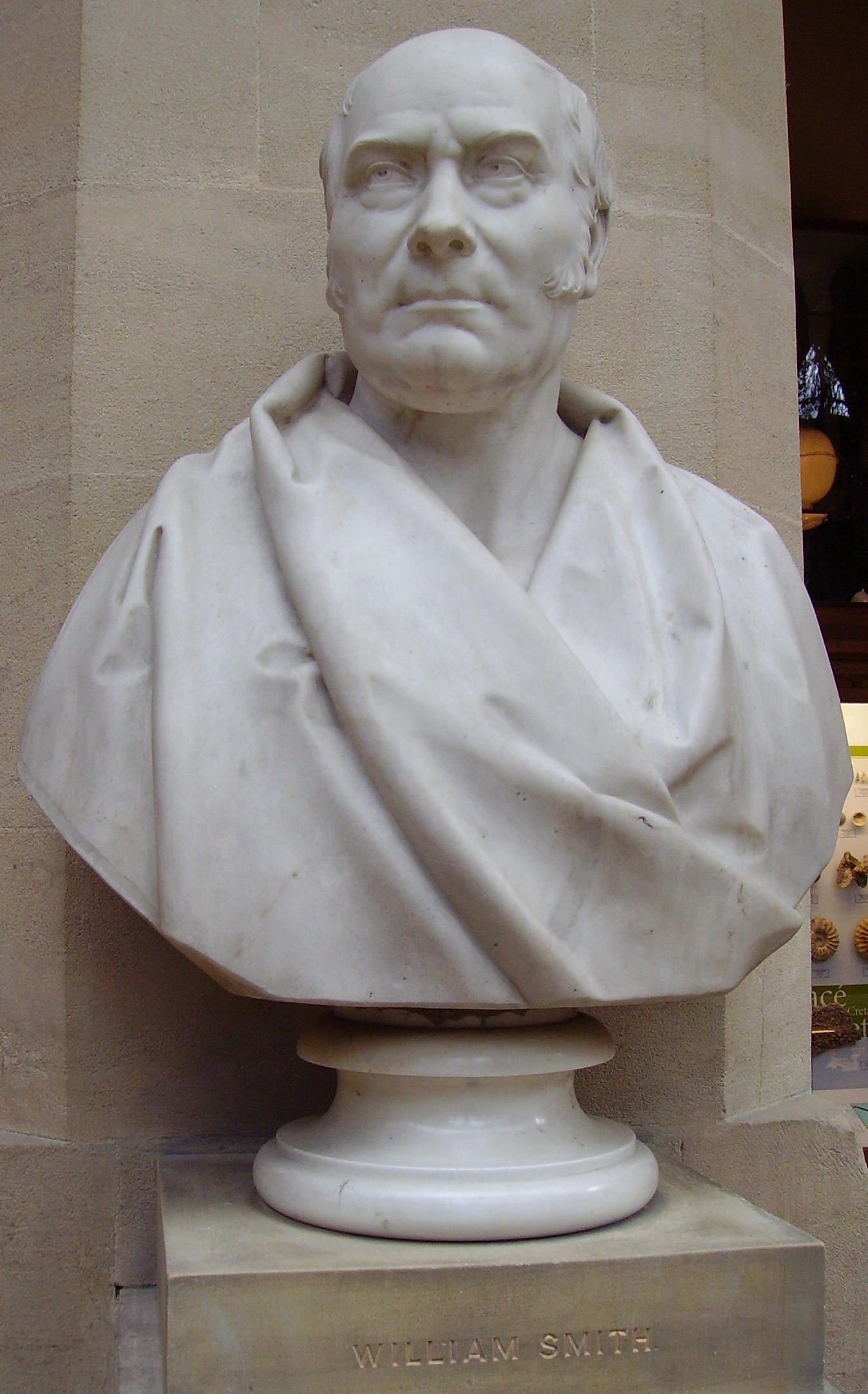
Bust of William Smith, in the Oxford University Museum of Natural History

In the early 19th century, the mining industry and Industrial Revolution stimulated the rapid development of the stratigraphic column – "the sequence of rock formations arranged according to their order of formation in time." In England, the mining surveyor William Smith, starting in the 1790s, found empirically that fossils were a highly effective means of distinguishing between otherwise similar formations of the landscape as he travelled the country working on the canal system and produced the first geological map of Britain. At about the same time, the French comparative anatomist Georges Cuvier assisted by his colleague Alexandre Brogniart at the École des Mines de Paris realized that the relative ages of fossils could be determined from a geological standpoint; in terms of what layer of rock the fossils are located and the distance these layers of rock are from the surface of the Earth. Through the synthesis of their findings, Brogniart and Cuvier realized that different strata could be identified by fossil contents and thus each stratum could be assigned to a unique position in a sequence.

After the publication of Cuvier and Brongniart's book, "Description Geologiques des Environs de Paris" in 1811, which outlined the concept, stratigraphy became very popular amongst geologists; many hoped to apply this concept to all the rocks of the Earth. During this century various geologists further refined and completed the stratigraphic column. For instance, in 1833 while Adam Sedgwick was mapping rocks that he had established were from the Cambrian Period, Charles Lyell was elsewhere suggesting a subdivision of the Tertiary Period; whilst Roderick Murchison, mapping into Wales from a different direction, was assigning the upper parts of Sedgwick's Cambrian to the lower parts of his own Silurian Period. The stratigraphic column was significant because it supplied a method to assign a relative age of these rocks by slotting them into different positions in their stratigraphical sequence. This created a global approach to dating the age of the Earth and allowed for further correlations to be drawn from similarities found in the makeup of the Earth's crust in various countries.

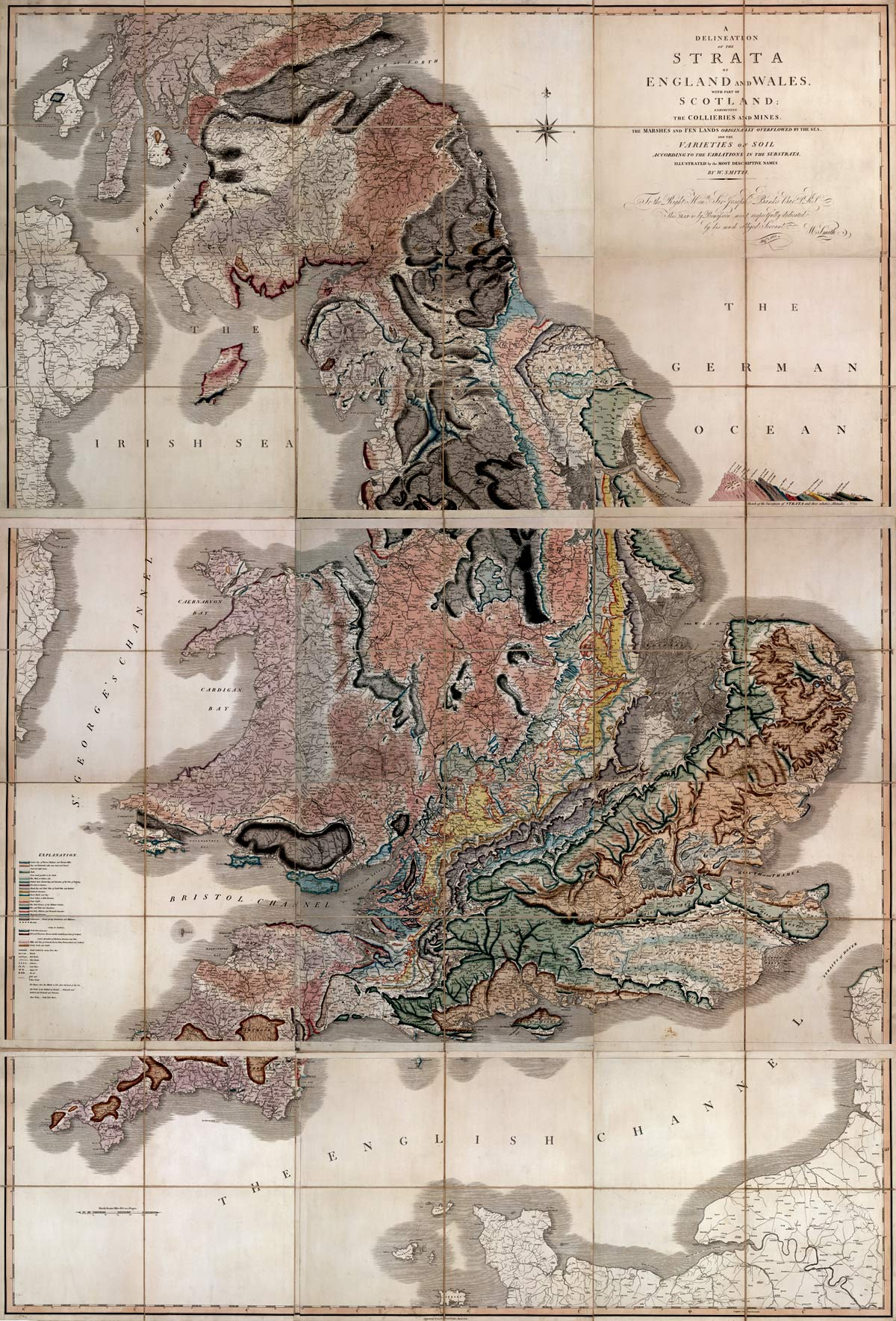
Geological map of Great Britain by William Smith, published 1815

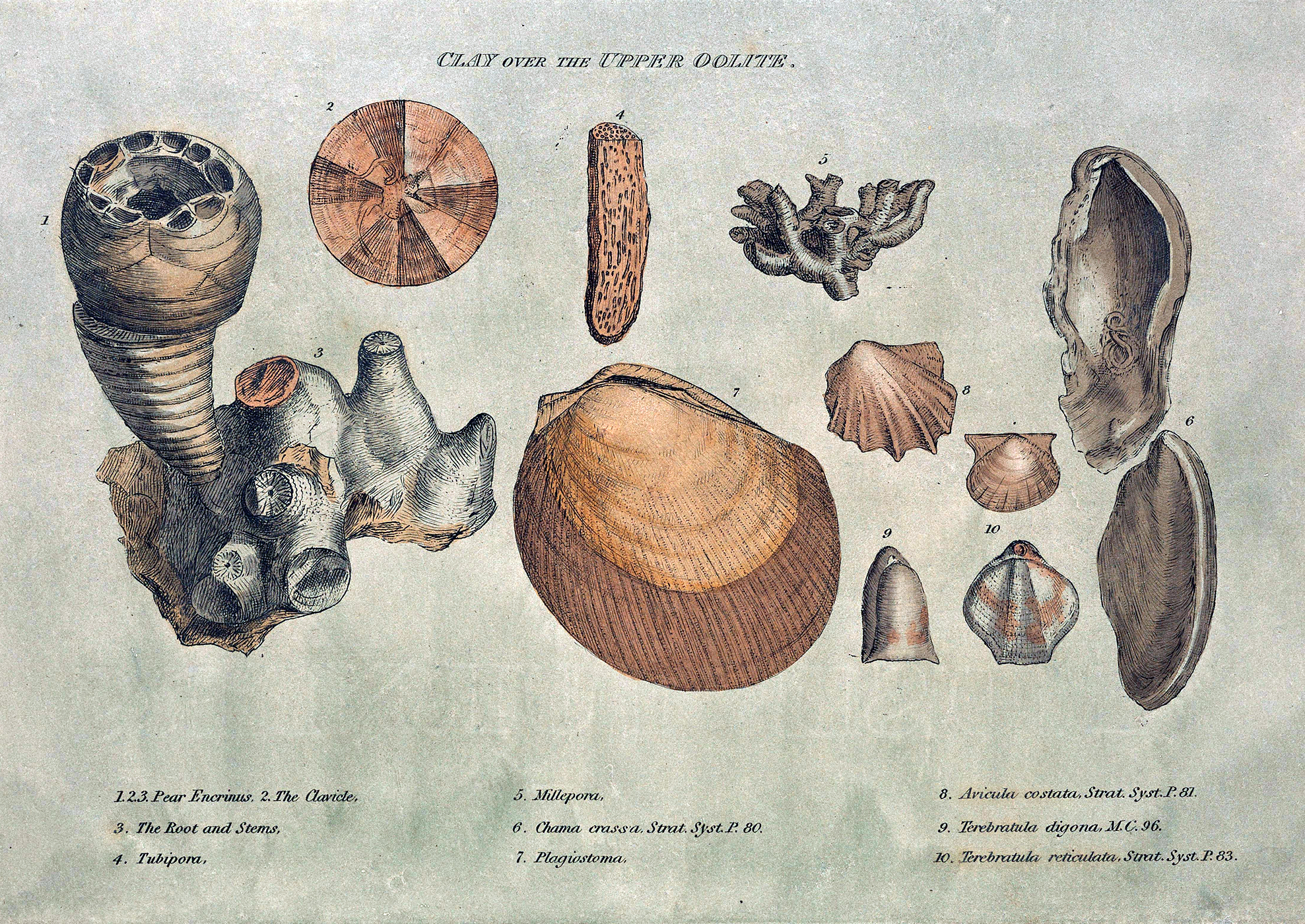
Engraving from William Smith's 1815 monograph on identifying strata by fossils

In early nineteenth-century Britain, catastrophism was adapted with the aim of reconciling geological science with religious traditions of the biblical Great Flood. In the early 1820s English geologists including William Buckland and Adam Sedgwick interpreted "diluvial" deposits as the outcome of Noah's flood, but by the end of the decade they revised their opinions in favour of local inundations. Charles Lyell challenged catastrophism with the publication in 1830 of the first volume of his book Principles of Geology which presented a variety of geological evidence from England, France, Italy and Spain to prove Hutton's ideas of gradualism correct. He argued that most geological change had been very gradual in human history. Lyell provided evidence for Uniformitarianism, a geological doctrine holding that processes occur at the same rates in the present as they did in the past and account for all of the Earth's geological features. Lyell's works were popular and widely read, and the concept of Uniformitarianism took a strong hold in geological society.

In 1831 Captain Robert FitzRoy, given charge of the coastal survey expedition of HMS Beagle, sought a suitable naturalist to examine the land and give geological advice. This fell to Charles Darwin, who had just completed his BA degree and had accompanied Sedgwick on a two-week Welsh mapping expedition after taking his Spring course on geology. Fitzroy gave Darwin Lyell's Principles of Geology, and Darwin became an advocate of Lyell's ideas, inventively theorising on uniformitarian principles about the geological processes he saw, and even challenging some of Lyell's ideas. He speculated about the Earth expanding to explain uplift, then on the basis of the idea that ocean areas sank as land was uplifted, theorised that coral atolls grew from fringing coral reefs round sinking volcanic islands. This idea was confirmed when the Beagle surveyed the Cocos (Keeling) Islands, and in 1842 he published his theory on The Structure and Distribution of Coral Reefs. Darwin's discovery of giant fossils helped to establish his reputation as a geologist, and his theorising about the causes of their extinction led to his theory of evolution by natural selection published in On the Origin of Species in 1859.

Economic motivations for the practical use of geological data inspired some governments to support geological research. During the 19th century several countries, including Canada, Australia, Great Britain and the United States, initiated geological surveying that would produce geological maps of vast areas of the countries. Geological mapping provides the location of useful rocks and minerals and such information could be used to benefit the country's mining and quarrying industries. With the government and industrial funding of geological research, more individuals undertook study of geology as technology and techniques improved, leading to the expansion of the field of the science.

In the 19th century, geological inquiry had estimated the age of the Earth in terms of millions of years. In 1862, the physicist William Thomson, 1st Baron Kelvin, published calculations that fixed the age of the Earth at between 20 million and 400 million years. He assumed that the Earth had formed as a completely molten object, and estimated the amount of time it would take for the near-surface to cool to its present temperature. Many geologists contended that Thomson's estimates were inadequate to account for observed thicknesses of sedimentary rock, evolution of life, and the formation of the crystalline basement rocks beneath the sedimentary cover. The discovery of radioactivity in the early twentieth century provided an additional source of heat within the Earth, allowing for an increase in Thomson's calculated age, as well as a means of dating geological events.

== 20th century ==
By the early 20th Century radiogenic isotopes had been discovered and radiometric dating had been developed. In 1911 Arthur Holmes, among the pioneers in the use of radioactive decay as a means of measuring geological time, dated a sample from Ceylon at 1.6 billion years old using lead isotopes. In 1913 Holmes was on the staff of Imperial College, when he published his famous book The Age of the Earth in which he argued strongly in favour of the use of radiometric dating methods rather than methods based on geological sedimentation or cooling of the Earth (many people still clung to Lord Kelvin's calculations of less than 100 million years). Holmes estimated the oldest Archean rocks to be 1,600 million years old, but did not speculate about the Earth's age. His promotion of the theory over the next decades earned him the nickname of Father of Modern Geochronology.

In 1921, attendees at the yearly meeting of the British Association for the Advancement of Science came to a rough consensus that the age of the Earth was a few billion years and that radiometric dating was credible. Holmes published The Age of the Earth, an Introduction to Geological Ideas in 1927 in which he presented a range of 1.6 to 3.0 billion years increasing the estimate in the 1940s to 4,500 ± 100 million years, based on measurements of the relative abundance of uranium isotopes established by Alfred O. C. Nier. Theories that did not comply with the scientific evidence that established the age of the Earth could no longer be accepted. The established age of the Earth has been refined since then but has not significantly changed.

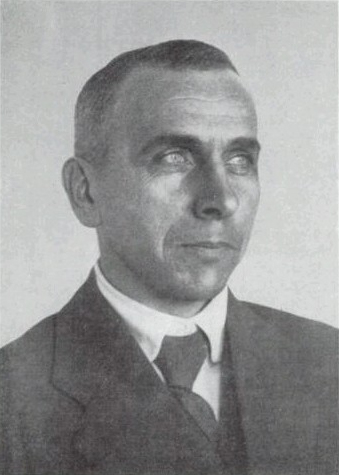
Alfred Wegener, around 1925

In 1912 Alfred Wegener proposed the theory of continental drift. This theory suggests that the shapes of continents and matching coastline geology between some continents indicates they were joined together in the past and formed a single landmass known as Pangaea; thereafter they separated and drifted like rafts over the ocean floor, currently reaching their present position. Additionally, the theory of continental drift offered a possible explanation as to the formation of mountains; plate tectonics built on the theory of continental drift.

Unfortunately, Wegener provided no convincing mechanism for this drift, and his ideas were not generally accepted during his lifetime. Arthur Holmes accepted Wegener's theory and provided a mechanism: mantle convection, to cause the continents to move. However, it was not until after the Second World War that new evidence started to accumulate that supported continental drift. There followed a period of 20 years during which the theory of continental drift developed from being believed by a few to being the cornerstone of modern geology. Beginning in 1947 research provided new evidence about the ocean floor, and in 1960 Bruce C. Heezen published the concept of mid-ocean ridges. Soon after this, Robert S. Dietz and Harry H. Hess proposed that the oceanic crust forms as the seafloor spreads apart along mid-ocean ridges in seafloor spreading. This was seen as confirmation of mantle convection and so the major stumbling block to the theory was removed.

Geophysical evidence suggested lateral motion of continents and that oceanic crust is younger than continental crust. This geophysical evidence also spurred the hypothesis of paleomagnetism, the record of the orientation of the Earth's magnetic field recorded in magnetic minerals. British geophysicist S. K. Runcorn suggested the concept of paleomagnetism from his finding that the continents had moved relative to the Earth's magnetic poles. Tuzo Wilson, who was a promoter of the sea floor spreading hypothesis and continental drift from the very beginning, added the concept of transform faults to the model, completing the classes of fault types necessary to make the mobility of the plates on the globe function. A symposium on continental drift that was held at the Royal Society of London in 1965 must be regarded as the official start of the acceptance of plate tectonics by the scientific community. The abstracts from the symposium are issued as Blacket, Bullard, Runcorn; 1965. In this symposium, Edward Bullard and co-workers showed with a computer calculation how the continents along both sides of the Atlantic would best fit to close the ocean, which became known as the famous "Bullard's Fit". By the late 1960s the weight of the evidence available saw continental drift as the generally accepted theory.

== Modern geology ==
By applying sound stratigraphic principles to the distribution of craters on the Moon, it can be argued that almost overnight, Gene Shoemaker took the study of the Moon away from Lunar astronomers and gave it to Lunar geologists.

In recent years, geology has continued its tradition as the study of the character and origin of the Earth, its surface features and internal structure. What changed in the later 20th century is the perspective of geological study. Geology was now studied using a more integrative approach, considering the Earth in a broader context encompassing the atmosphere, biosphere and hydrosphere. Satellites located in space that take wide scope photographs of the Earth provide such a perspective.

In 1972, The Landsat Program, a series of satellite missions jointly managed by NASA and the U.S. Geological Survey, began supplying satellite images that can be geologically analyzed. These images can be used to map major geological units, recognize and correlate rock types for vast regions and track the movements of Plate Tectonics. A few applications of this data include the ability to produce geologically detailed maps, locate sources of natural energy and predict possible natural disasters caused by plate shifts.

== See also ==
- International Commission on the History of Geological Sciences (INHIGEO)
- History of geomagnetism; History of paleontology
- Outline of Earth science
- Humboldtian science
- Timeline of geology; * Timeline of the development of tectonophysics (before 1954)
- History of Geology and Mining (Information System)

== Sources ==
- Albritton, Claude C. (1980). The Abyss of Time. San Francisco: Freeman, Cooper & Company. Albritton, Claude C. (1986). 1986 reprint. J.P. Tarcher. ISBN 087477389X.
- Dalrymple, G. Brent (1994). The Age of the Earth. Stanford University Press. ISBN 0-8047-2331-1.
- Adams, Frank Dawson (1938). The Birth and Development of the Geological Sciences. Baltimore: The Williams & Wilkins Company. Adams, Frank Dawson (1954). 1990 Dover reprint. Dover Publications.
- Gohau, Gabriel (1990). A history of geology. Revised and translated by Albert V. Carozzi and Marguerite Carozzi. New Brunswick: Rutgers University Press. ISBN 978-0-8135-1666-0.
- Jardine, N.; Secord, J. A.; Spary, E. C., eds. (1996). Cultures of natural history (Reprinted ed.). Cambridge, England: Cambridge University Press. ISBN 978-0-521-55894-5.
- Woods, Thomas E. (2005). How the Catholic Church built Western civilization. Washington, D.C.: Regnery Publ. ISBN 0-89526-038-7.
- Wyse Jackson, Patrick N., ed. (2007). Four centuries of geological travel : the search for knowledge on foot, bicycle, sledge and camel. London: The Geological Society. ISBN 978-1-86239-234-2.
