= Kenneth C. Macdonald =

American oceanographer (born 1947)

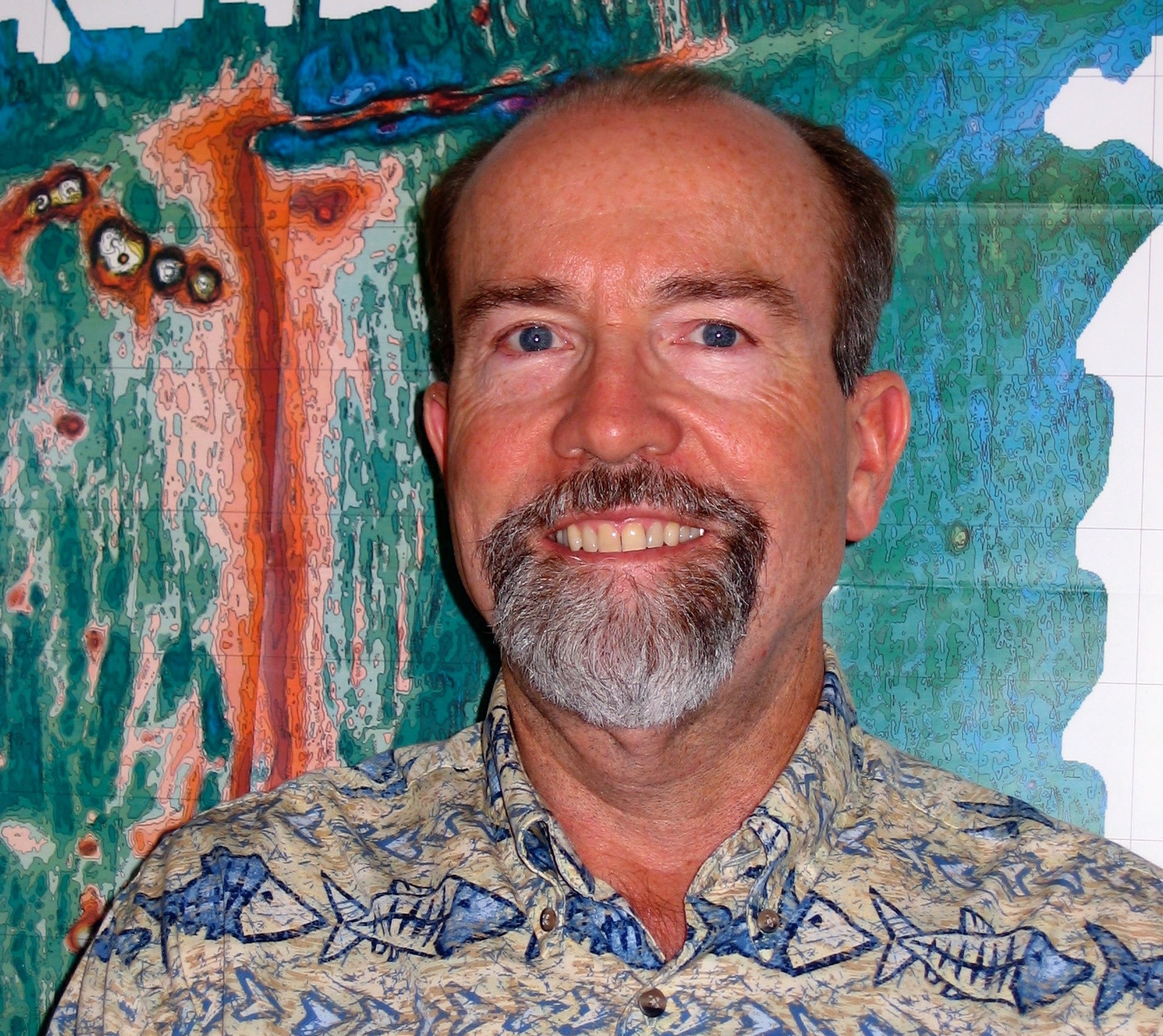
- Macdonald and map of East Pacific Rise crest at 9°N
- Born: 1947 (age 78–79)
- Education: UC Berkeley MIT
- Known for: ocean spreading centers deep sea hydrothermal vents
- Awards: Fellow Geological Soc. America; Fellow Amer. Geophys. Union; Fellow Amer. Assoc. Adv. Science; Member, American Academy of Arts and Sciences; Cody Medal; Newcomb Cleveland Prize of Amer. Assoc. Adv. Science
- Scientific career
- Workplaces: Woods Hole Oceanographic Institution; Scripps Institution of Oceanography; UC Santa Barbara
- Doctoral advisor: Bruce Luyendyk, Tanya Atwater
- Website: www.geol.ucsb.edu/faculty/macdonald/index.php

Kenneth Craig Macdonald is an American oceanographer and marine geophysicist born in San Francisco, California, in 1947. As of 2018 he is professor emeritus at the Department of Earth Science and the Marine Sciences Institute at the University of California, Santa Barbara (UCSB). His work focuses on the tectonics and geophysics of the global mid-oceanic ridge including its spreading centers and transform faults, two of the three types of plate boundaries central to the theory of plate tectonics. His work has taken him to the north and south Atlantic oceans, the north and south Pacific oceans, the Indian Ocean, the Red Sea and the Sea of Cortez, as well as to the deep seafloor on over 50 dives in the research submersible ALVIN. Macdonald has participated in over 40 deep sea expeditions, and was chief- or co-chief scientist on 31 expeditions.

== Early life and education ==
Macdonald grew up in El Cerrito and Richmond, California, and graduated from Harry Ells High School in 1966. He attended UC Berkeley graduating with a B.S. in engineering in 1970. Funded by a National Science Foundation Graduate Fellowship, he attended the Massachusetts Institute of Technology in 1970, graduating from the MIT/Woods Hole Oceanographic Institution Joint Program in Oceanography specializing in marine geophysics in 1975. He was awarded a Cecil H. and Ida Green Research Fellowship to work at the Institute of Geophysics and Planetary Physics with James Brune in 1975. He joined the research staff at the Scripps Institution of Oceanography in 1976 as Research Geophysicist working with Fred Spiess. In 1979, he joined the faculty of the Department of Geological Sciences at UCSB and the Marine Sciences Institute as an associate professor and research geophysicist.

== Career and impact ==
His PhD work focused on the tectonic and magnetic properties of the Mid-Atlantic Ridge on Project FAMOUS expeditions led by Bruce Luyendyk. (his other primary advisor was Tanya Atwater).

He was co-chief scientist of the RISE project - a research expedition which discovered superheated "black smoker" hydrothermal vents on the East Pacific Rise in 1979, and was the first to calculate their contribution to global geothermal heat flux. He was also chief scientist and lead diver on the expedition which documented in situ, the recording of magnetic reversals in the volcanic rocks of the deep seafloor, an important aspect of proving seafloor spreading and plate tectonics.

Macdonald led expeditions which mapped the Vema and Tamayo transform faults, showing that the plate boundary intersection of an oceanic ridge and transform fault is sharp, only a few km in area, and documenting that these two types of plate boundaries are narrow. Their work demonstrated that the inside corner region is an area of diffuse deformation caused by extreme tectonic extension.

He was chief scientist on the expedition which discovered “Overlapping Spreading Centers” (OSCs). In this geometry two active spreading centers overlap, apparently pushing against each other, which would violate one of the rules of plate tectonics: plates are rigid. This paradox is solved by the fact that the OSCs are non-steady-state, and propagate along the ridge; as one segment lengthens, the neighboring segment shortens, and the overlapped region migrates.

Previous to this discovery, it was thought that mid-ocean ridges were offset only by transform faults, usually at right angles. The expedition found that the ridge is segmented on a length scale of hundreds of kilometers by transform faults, but also at much shorter scales, km to tens of kilometers, by Overlapping Spreading Centers and other types of nontransform discontinuities. The long segments persist for millions of years, while the finer scale segments are shorter-lived, hundreds of thousands of years or less. The shorter segments are important because they define the scale at which individual volcanoes function on the ridge, which, in turn, control the creation of new oceanic crust and hydrothermal activity

== Awards and honors ==
In recognition of his work he was the first marine geophysicist to be awarded the Cody gold medal and prize for his outstanding work and leadership in the Ocean Sciences as well as election as Fellow to the American Academy of Arts and Sciences, Fellow of the American Association for the Advancement of Science, Fellow of the American Geophysical Union (1995), Fellow of the Geological Society of America (1995) and co-recipient of the Newcomb Cleveland Prize for the most important article published in Science magazine in 1980 for the discovery and analysis of black smoker vents.

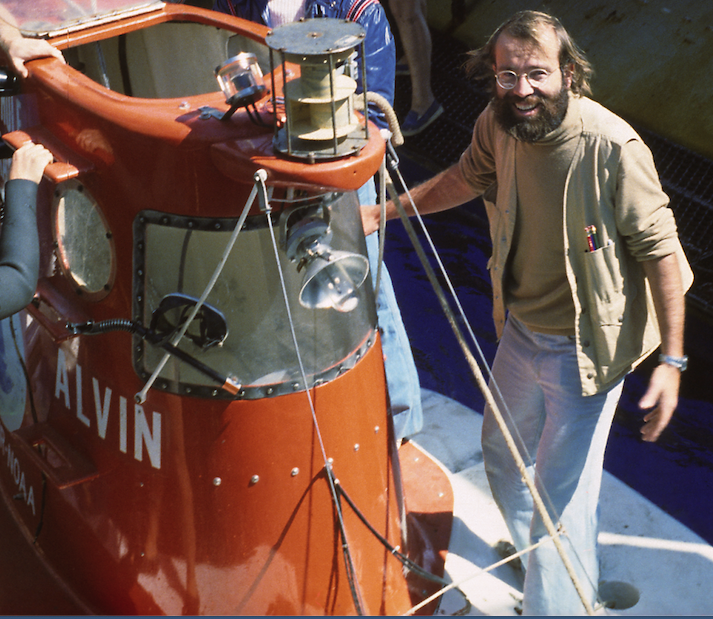
KC Macdonald on RISE project expedition

== Leadership in the profession ==
He has contributed to the advancement of ocean sciences by serving on the Ocean Studies Board of the National Academy of Sciences (1980–83), the Oceanic Lithosphere Panel for the Advanced Drilling Project (Deep Sea Drilling Project) (1983–85), member of the ALVIN Review Committee (1979–82), founding member of the RIDGE Steering Committee (1987–90), member of the U.S. Geodynamics Committee (of the National Research Council) (1999–2000), Chairman National Undersea Research Panel of the National Undersea Research Program (NOAA) (2002), member of the Woods Hole Oceanographic Institution Corporation, and numerous panels and future planning committees for the National Science Foundation, in particular for NSF Ocean Sciences program.

He has also served in the following editorial capacities: associate editor, Journal of Geophysical Research; associate editor, Earth and Planetary Science Letters; co-editor, Marine Geophysical Researches; section editor, Encyclopedia of Ocean Sciences; section editor, Encyclopedia of Geology.

== Public outreach and media ==
His work has been featured in the National Geographic, the New York Times (on page 1), Physics Today, Islands Magazine, and Esquire Magazine. He has written for Scientific American, Oceanus Magazine, and American Scientist.

== Selected works ==
- Macdonald, K C (May 1982). "Mid-Ocean Ridges: Fine Scale Tectonic, Volcanic and Hydrothermal Processes Within the Plate Boundary Zone". Annual Review of Earth and Planetary Sciences. 10 (1): 155–190. Bibcode:1982AREPS..10..155M. doi:10.1146/annurev.ea.10.050182.001103.
- Macdonald, Ken; Sempere, Jean-Christophe; Fox, P. J. (1984). "East Pacific Rise from Siqueiros to Orozco Fracture Zones: Along-strike continuity of axial neovolcanic zone and structure and evolution of overlapping spreading centers". Journal of Geophysical Research: Solid Earth. 89 (B7): 6049–6069. Bibcode:1984JGR....89.6049M. doi:10.1029/JB089iB07p06049.
- Macdonald, Ken C.; Fox, P. J.; Perram, L. J.; Eisen, M. F.; Haymon, R. M.; Miller, S. P.; Carbotte, S. M.; Cormier, M.-H.; Shor, A. N. (September 1988). "A new view of the mid-ocean ridge from the behaviour of ridge-axis discontinuities". Nature. 335 (6187): 217–225. Bibcode:1988Natur.335..217M. doi:10.1038/335217a0. S2CID 4239584.
- Macdonald, K. C.; Scheirer, D. S.; Carbotte, S. M. (30 August 1991). "Mid-Ocean Ridges: Discontinuities, Segments and Giant Cracks". Science. 253 (5023): 986–994. Bibcode:1991Sci...253..986M. doi:10.1126/science.253.5023.986. PMID 17775341. S2CID 24567500.
- Haymon, Rachel M.; Fornari, Daniel J.; Edwards, Margo H.; Carbotte, Suzanne; Wright, Dawn; Macdonald, Ken C. (1 June 1991). "Hydrothermal vent distribution along the East Pacific Rise crest (9°09′–54′N) and its relationship to magmatic and tectonic processes on fast-spreading mid-ocean ridges". Earth and Planetary Science Letters. 104 (2–4): 513–534. Bibcode:1991E&PSL.104..513H. doi:10.1016/0012-821X(91)90226-8. S2CID 128614514.
- Carbotte, Suzanne; Macdonald, Ken (1992). "East Pacific Rise 8°–10°30′N: Evolution of ridge segments and discontinuities from SeaMARC II and three-dimensional magnetic studies". Journal of Geophysical Research: Solid Earth. 97 (B5): 6959–6982. doi:10.1029/91JB03065.
- Macdonald, Ken C.; Fox, P. J.; Alexander, Russ T.; Pockalny, Robert; Gente, Pascal (March 1996). "Volcanic growth faults and the origin of Pacific abyssal hills". Nature. 380 (6570): 125–129. Bibcode:1996Natur.380..125M. doi:10.1038/380125a0. S2CID 4357788.
