= Rachel Haymon =

Marine geologist

Rachel Michal Haymon
- Born: 1953
- Education: University of California, San Diego
- Scientific career
- Workplaces: University of California, Santa Barbara
- Thesis: Hydrothermal deposition on the East Pacific Rise at 21° N (1982)

Rachel Haymon is a marine geologist known for her work linking geological and biological processes occurring at deep-sea hydrothermal vents. In 2005 she was elected a fellow of the Geological Society of America.

== Education and career ==
As a child growing up in Baton Rouge Louisiana, Marie Curie was the only woman scientist Haymon knew. Haymon had multiple ideas about careers as a child, including several scientific options such as oceanographer, archeologist, astronaut. or paleontologist. In college, she decided to study geology and has a B.A. from Rice University (1976). In 1982, she earned her Ph.D. from the University of California, San Diego working on hydrothermal deposits at 21°N on the East Pacific Rise. Following her Ph.D., she accepted a position at the University of California, Santa Barbara where she was promoted to professor in 1998. Haymon retired from full professor in 2010.

== Research ==
Haymon's research centers on the deposition of minerals at deep-sea hydrothermal vents. Haymon's work on ophiolites in Oman revealed fossils of hydrothermal vent worms and geological evidence of hydrothermal venting. As a graduate student, Haymon worked on the mineralogy of hydrothermal vents at 21ºN North along the East Pacific Rise using samples collected during the RISE project. Using data from 1989, Haymon mapped the distribution of hydrothermal vents along the 9ºNorth of the East Pacific Rise. Then, in 1991, Haymon led the team that returned to this site and discovered a recent eruption on the seafloor. They dubbed the area "Tube Worm Barbecue" because of the dead tubes worms found in the regions with recent lava flow. Haymon described the excitement of seeing the outcome of the recent eruption in a subsequent newspaper article. Repeated visits to the area revealed the tube worms were gone within eleven months after the eruption, replaced by small fish, octopus, and crabs. Later work by Haymon on the East Pacific Rise revealed hydrothermal venting along the ridge-flank sites, away from the black smokers. In 2006, Haymon led the team that discovered the first black smokers within the hydrothermal vents fields near the Galapagos.

=== Selected publications ===
- Haymon, Rachel M.; Fornari, Daniel J.; Edwards, Margo H.; Carbotte, Suzanne; Wright, Dawn; Macdonald, Ken C. (1 June 1991). "Hydrothermal vent distribution along the East Pacific Rise crest (9°09′–54′N) and its relationship to magmatic and tectonic processes on fast-spreading mid-ocean ridges". Earth and Planetary Science Letters. 104 (2): 513–534. Bibcode:1991E&PSL.104..513H. doi:10.1016/0012-821X(91)90226-8. ISSN 0012-821X. S2CID 128614514.
- Haymon, Rachel M. (February 1983). "Growth history of hydrothermal black smoker chimneys". Nature. 301 (5902): 695–698. Bibcode:1983Natur.301..695H. doi:10.1038/301695a0. S2CID 45206494.
- Haymon, Rachel M.; Kastner, Miriam (1 May 1981). "Hot spring deposits on the East Pacific Rise at 21°N: preliminary description of mineralogy and genesis". Earth and Planetary Science Letters. 53 (3): 363–381. Bibcode:1981E&PSL..53..363H. doi:10.1016/0012-821X(81)90041-8. ISSN 0012-821X.
- Spiess, F. N.; Macdonald, Ken C.; Atwater, T.; Ballard, R.; Carranza, A.; Cordoba, D.; Cox, C.; Garcia, V. M. Diaz; Francheteau, J.; Guerrero, J.; Hawkins, J.; Haymon, R.; Hessler, R.; Juteau, T.; Kastner, M.; Larson, R.; Luyendyk, B.; Macdougall, J. D.; Miller, S.; Normark, W.; Orcutt, J.; Rangin, C. (28 March 1980). "East Pacific Rise: Hot Springs and Geophysical Experiments". Science. 207 (4438): 1421–1433. Bibcode:1980Sci...207.1421S. doi:10.1126/science.207.4438.1421. PMID 17779602. S2CID 28363398.
- Haymon, R. M.; Fornari, D. J.; Von Damm, K. L.; Lilley, M. D.; Perfit, M. R.; Edmond, J. M.; Shanks, W. C.; Lutz, R. A.; Grebmeier, J. M.; Carbotte, S.; Wright, D.; McLaughlin, E.; Smith, M.; Beedle, N.; Olson, E. (1 August 1993). "Volcanic eruption of the mid-ocean ridge along the East Pacific Rise crest at 9°45–52′N: Direct submersible observations of seafloor phenomena associated with an eruption event in April, 1991". Earth and Planetary Science Letters. 119 (1): 85–101. Bibcode:1993E&PSL.119...85H. doi:10.1016/0012-821X(93)90008-W. ISSN 0012-821X.

== Awards and honors ==
- AAAS-Newcomb-Cleveland Award (1980), for Spiess et al. paper
- Hans Pettersson Bronze Medal, Royal Swedish Academy of Sciences (1999)
- Fellow, Geological Society of America (2005)
