= Fred Spiess =

American marine biologist

Fred N. Spiess
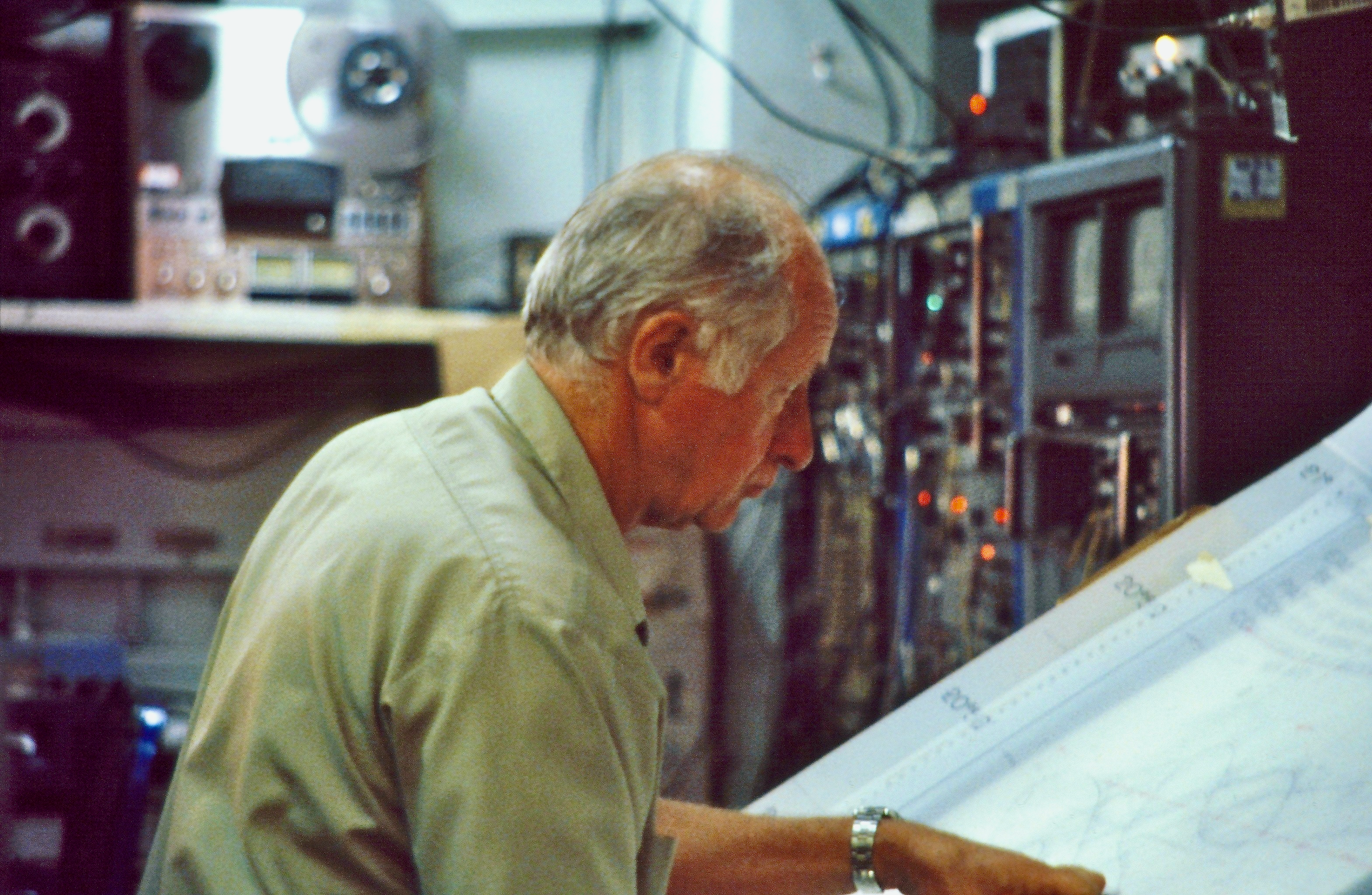
- Fred Spiess in lab of R/V Melville, RISE Project, 1979
- Born: 1919
- Died: 2006 (aged 86–87)
- Education: B.S.; Ph.D. UC Berkeley; M.S. Harvard
- Known for: Ocean engineering
- Awards: Maurice Ewing Medal; National Academy of Engineering

Dr. Fred Noel Spiess (December 25, 1919 – September 8, 2006) was a naval officer, oceanographer and marine explorer. His work created new advances in marine technology including the FLIP Floating Instrument Platform, the Deep Tow vehicle for study of the seafloor, and the use of acoustics for underwater navigation and geodetic positioning.

== Education and career ==
Spiess (pronounced SPEES) was born in Oakland, California. He received an undergraduate degree from the University of California, Berkeley and a master's degree from Harvard University. He received his doctorate in physics from UC Berkeley in 1951.

After graduating in 1941 from Berkeley, he received a commission from the US Naval Reserve Officers Training Corps. During World War II, he made a record 13 war patrols on submarines in the Pacific Ocean and was awarded Silver and Bronze Stars for gallantry in combat. He continued in the Naval Reserve from 1946–56 and retired with the rank of captain, serving as the Deputy Oceanographer of the Navy from 1969 to 1974. Spiess' method for reckoning the position of an object from successive sonar contacts is still a standard for training of US Naval Officers.

Spiess joined the Marine Physical Laboratory at the Scripps Institution of Oceanography in 1952 and served as director of the laboratory from 1958 to 1980. He served as director of the Scripps Institution from 1964 to 1965.

Spiess was awarded the John Price Wetherill Medal in 1965 and the Maurice Ewing Medal in 1983. He was elected to the National Academy of Engineering in 1985. He was a fellow of the Acoustical Society of America, and was awarded their Pioneers of Underwater Acoustics Medal in 1985 for "his leadership and insight in applying acoustics to study the ocean and the sea floor, for his many ingenious scientific and engineering contributions; for his introduction of students, scientists, and many others to underwater acoustics."

== R/P FLIP ==
Spiess is worked on the creation of R/P FLIP (Floating Instrument Platform), a unique 355-foot-long (108 m) research platform that is towed to the work area and then rotated to a vertical position to form a stable observation post in deep water. Spiess collaborated with Fred Fisher and Phillip Rudnick in development of the vessel.

FLIP has been used to study the acoustics of whales and other marine mammals, heat exchange between the ocean and the atmosphere, and the effects of seismic waves on water.

== Deep Tow ==
The development of the echo sounder for seafloor mapping was refined during World War II. Soon research ships crossing the oceans outlined the mid-ocean ridges, fracture zones, and deep-sea trenches. Because these devices sent out broad-beam sound waves from the sea surface, details of the seafloor shape remained obscured by fuzzy smeared-out echoes. Ship navigation was so inaccurate that features smaller than a few kilometers across could not be mapped with any certainty. Spiess’ solution to the resolution and mapping problem was twofold; bring the echo sounder close to the seafloor and locate the device within a seabed survey navigation network.

During the 1960s, Spiess and his engineers at the Marine Physical Laboratory of Scripps developed the Deep Tow instrument for mapping the deep seafloor from an altitude of tens of meters. The deep-tow instrument used a narrow-beam downward-looking echosounder, side-scan sonars, and subbottom profiling system to map features in unprecedented detail, e.g., geologic observations that approached that of outcrop mapping for land geologists. Evolution of the Deep Tow to improve seafloor mapping saw the addition of a magnetometer, cameras, video, water samplers, plankton nets, and other instruments as more varied seafloor environments were examined.

The Deep Tow instrument was notably used in Project FAMOUS, the first-ever geologic mapping of the median rift valley of the Mid-Atlantic Ridge.

== Acoustic transponders ==
Spiess recognized that obtaining detailed images of the seafloor was only one component that is necessary for making geologic maps of the deep-sea floor. The position of the Deep Tow vehicle must be known to within a few meters, thus leading to the development of the first seafloor acoustic transponder positioning system for working in deep water. The acoustic transponder capability eventually evolved into instruments for acoustic geodetic measurements by combining the technologies of seafloor acoustic beacons with shipboard GPS positioning. This geodetic system has been successfully deployed for directly measuring the direction of movement and speed of the oceanic Juan de Fuca lithospheric plate and for documenting movement on submarine landslides.

== RISE expedition and black smoker hydrothermal vents ==
During the mid 1970s, several Deep Tow cruises to the mouth of the Gulf of California at 21^{o} N resulted in production of a geologic map of the East Pacific Rise (EPR) spreading ridge axis. The map was then used as the base for conducting diving programs using both French and US crewed submersibles. These were the CYAMEX and RISE expeditions; the latter led by Spiess and Ken Macdonald. One of Spiess' projects during the RISE expedition (with Bruce Luyendyk) was to use the crewed submersible ALVIN for seafloor gravity measurements across the axis of spreading. The diving expedition ultimately resulted in the discovery of high temperature black-smoker vents for which Spiess and his coauthors received the Newcomb Cleveland Prize for the best paper published in Science magazine in 1980.

== Death ==
Spiess died September 8, 2006, in San Diego, California, of cancer.

== See also ==
- Tanya M Atwater
- Kathleen Crane
- War in the Pacific
- Allied submarines in the Pacific War
