= Margo Edwards =

Marine geologist

- Education: Washington University in St. Louis; Columbia University
- Scientific career
- Workplaces: University of Hawaiʻi at Mānoa
- Thesis: The morphotectonic fabric of the East Pacific Rise : implications for fault generation and crustal accretion (1992)

Margo Helen Edwards is a marine geologist known for mapping of the seafloor and hydrothermal vents. She led the 1999 SCICEX and was the first women to live aboard a United States' Navy submarine while doing under-ice research.

== Education and career ==
Edwards has an undergraduate degree in computer science and geology from Washington University in St. Louis (1985). She then received her Ph.D. from Columbia University where she mapped the seafloor along the East Pacific Rise. She joined UH in 1991 as a senior research scientist, served as the director of Hawai'i Mapping Research Group and the director of the U.S. Department of Homeland Security's National Center for Island, Maritime and Extreme Environment Security (CIMES). As of 2021, she is the director of the Applied Research Laboratory.

Edwards served as the chair of the University-National Oceanographic Laboratory System (UNOLS)'s Arctic Icebreaker Coordinating Committee from 2004 until 2007.

== Research ==
Edwards' research centers on the development of high resolution maps, and analysis of photographic and acoustic data. In 1988, while she was at Washington University in St. Louis, Edwards assembled the ETOPO5 5-minute map of land and seafloor elevations. During her graduate work she developed maps of the seafloor in the Pacific Ocean, including the seafloor at the East Pacific Rise, where she detailed its shape and the locations of hydrothermal vents. Edwards led the Hawai'i Mapping Research Group which developed the HAWAII MR1, an instrument that allows high resolution imaging of the seafloor, and was used to map the features of the Sirena Deep, one of the deepest places in the worlds' ocean.

Edwards was the first woman to live aboard a Navy nuclear submarine during under-ice operations. When Edwards received funding to look at the Arctic, women were not permitted to live aboard a submarine while it was at sea. In her 2020 book, Rita Colwell, the former head of the United States' National Science Foundation, described her conversation with Admiral Paul Gaffney about the Navy's concerns but Colwell prevailed. In 1999, during the SCICEX project, Edwards spent thirteen days on the USS Hawkbill where she found evidence of climate change in the Arctic, including thinning sea ice, volcanoes on the seafloor, and warm water moving into the Arctic from the Atlantic Ocean. This research has also expanded the maps of the Arctic's seafloor which allows investigations into understanding of physical processes in the region.

Her work in Hawaii uses time-lapse photographs of military munitions disposed at sea at the end of World War II. Edwards' research informed the discussion on the potential destruction of chemical weapons as she noted the munitions should remain on the seafloor. Edward's group at the University of Hawaii obtained top secret clearance for Navy Research in 2018 because of their projects on data analysis, drone research, waste disposal, renewable energy, and cybersecurity. At the same time, she opens her group to the public by running camps to train people on how to fly personal drones.

== Selected publications ==
- Jakobsson, Martin; Macnab, Ron; Mayer, Larry; Anderson, Robert; Edwards, Margo; Hatzky, Jörn; Schenke, Hans Werner; Johnson, Paul (2008). "An improved bathymetric portrayal of the Arctic Ocean: Implications for ocean modeling and geological, geophysical and oceanographic analyses". Geophysical Research Letters. 35 (7). Bibcode:2008GeoRL..35.7602J. doi:10.1029/2008GL033520. ISSN 1944-8007. S2CID 55742003.
- Jakobsson, Martin; Mayer, Larry; Coakley, Bernard; Dowdeswell, Julian A.; Forbes, Steve; Fridman, Boris; Hodnesdal, Hanne; Noormets, Riko; Pedersen, Richard; Rebesco, Michele; Schenke, Hans Werner (2012). "The International Bathymetric Chart of the Arctic Ocean (IBCAO) Version 3.0". Geophysical Research Letters. 39 (12). Bibcode:2012GeoRL..3912609J. doi:10.1029/2012GL052219. hdl:2445/175672. ISSN 1944-8007. S2CID 55994905.
- Cochran, James R.; Kurras, Gregory J.; Edwards, Margo H.; Coakley, Bernard J. (2003). "The Gakkel Ridge: Bathymetry, gravity anomalies, and crustal accretion at extremely slow spreading rates". Journal of Geophysical Research: Solid Earth. 108 (B2): 2116. Bibcode:2003JGRB..108.2116C. doi:10.1029/2002JB001830. ISSN 2156-2202. S2CID 129039240.
- Haymon, Rachel M.; Fornari, Daniel J.; Edwards, Margo H.; Carbotte, Suzanne; Wright, Dawn; Macdonald, Ken C. (1991-06-01). "Hydrothermal vent distribution along the East Pacific Rise crest (9°09′–54′N) and its relationship to magmatic and tectonic processes on fast-spreading mid-ocean ridges". Earth and Planetary Science Letters. 104 (2): 513–534. Bibcode:1991E&PSL.104..513H. doi:10.1016/0012-821X(91)90226-8. ISSN 0012-821X. S2CID 128614514.

== Awards and honors ==
In 2007, Edwards received the Distinguished Public Service Award from Admiral Thad Allen when he was the Commandant of the U.S. Coast Guard. She was named Honolulu's scientist of the year in 2009 by the ARCS program (Achievement Rewards for College Scientists).
