= Destruction of chemical weapons in the United States =

Attempts to destroy chemical weapons

Throughout history, chemical weapons have been used as strategic weaponry to devastate the enemy in times of war. After the mass destruction created by WWI and WWII, chemical weapons have been considered to be inhumane by most nations, and governments and organizations have undertaken to locate and destroy existing chemical weapons. However, not all nations have been willing to cooperate with disclosing or demilitarizing their inventory of chemical weapons. Since the start of the worldwide efforts to destroy all existing chemical weapons, some nations and terrorist organizations have used and threatened the use of chemical weapons to leverage their position. Examples of the use of chemical weapons since World War II are Iraq’s Saddam Hussein on the Kurdish village Halabja in 1988 and their employment against civilian passengers of the Tokyo subway by Aum Shinrikyo in 1995. The efforts made by the United States and other chemical weapon destruction agencies intend to prevent such use, but this is a difficult and ongoing effort. Aside from the difficulties of cooperation and locating chemical weapons, the methods to destroy the weapons and to do this safely are also a challenge.

The United States has been at the forefront of the chemical weapons reduction efforts since the late 1960s, when President Richard Nixon imposed a moratorium on the production of chemical weapons in the U.S. In 1979, the first pilot program for chemical weapons destruction was established; the preferred disposal technology commonly used today originated from this program. The first major program to destroy chemical weapons stockpiles in the United States began in 1990, two years before the drafting of an international agreement that called for a halt in production as well as the destruction of existing chemical weapons. The first destruction site was located at Johnston Atoll, just over 600 miles (970 km) southwest of Hawaii. Since then two sites have been set up under management of the Department of Defense and six locations managed by the Army, all located within the United States. While there is an almost universal agreement that the elimination of chemical weapons is in the best interest of all mankind, there are many concerns surrounding the destruction operations. Safety of personnel and surrounding communities is a main concern, and this has been addressed in several ways. The pollution produced by the preferred destruction method involving the incineration of the chemical agents and the munitions that contained them was another concern. The program has been incredibly expensive; in the 2011 budget proposal submitted to Congress in February 2010 just over half a billion dollars was allocated for two of the destruction sites. This amount of money would create many benefits for the surrounding communities in the form of both jobs and equipment provided to local cities and counties.

== Methods ==
=== Incineration ===
There are two common methods that the United States uses to dispose of chemical warfare agents and weapons. The primary method is incineration, where liquid agents are burned in a furnace of temperatures over 2,000 °F (1,093 °C). For chemical agents in delivery vessels (i.e. Mortars, Bombs, Artillery shells, etc.), this is a multi-step process. First the delivery vessels are robotically disassembled in a reverse order from that which they were originally assembled. Next the chemical agent is drained out of the projectile and sent to the liquid incinerator as the disassembled projectile parts are placed on a conveyor belt and fed into a metal furnace where they are melted at close to 1,500 °F (816 °C) for 15 minutes to ensure that any contamination has been completely destroyed. This method was originally developed in a pilot scale program which began in 1979 and is known as the Chemical Agent Munition Disposal System (CAMDS).

=== Neutralization ===
In the United States, neutralization was first selected as an alternative to incineration to destroy stockpiles of chemical agent stored in bulk. Depending on the type of agent to be destroyed, neutralization destroys the chemical agent by mixing it with hot water or hot water and sodium hydroxide. The U.S. Army’s Chemical Materials Agency applied this method to safely eliminate its stockpile of mustard agent in Edgewood, Maryland, and VX nerve agent in Newport, Indiana. Both stockpiles were stored in large steel containers without explosives or other weapon components. The industrial wastewater produced by the process, known as hydrolysate, was sent to a permitted commercial hazardous waste storage, treatment and disposal facility for treatment and disposal.

Neutralization is the selected method for the Department of Defense’s Assembled Chemical Weapons Alternatives facilities in Pueblo, Colorado, and Richmond, Kentucky.

== Sites in the United States ==
Chemical weapons destruction facilities

=== Pine Bluff ===
The Pine Bluff Arsenal is a former chemical weapons production, storage and disposal site located in southeastern Arkansas. Established in 1941, this 14,944-acre (60.48 km^{2}) facility was a manufacturing port for many chemical weapons. The Northwestern portion of the site contains 431 acres (1.74 km^{2}) of land that holds a 3,850 ton stockpile of weaponry. Currently all of the chemical weapons have been destroyed.

=== Blue Grass Army Depot ===
As one of the two sites administered by the defense department, the Blue Grass Army Depot has been storing chemical weapons since 1944. Located near Richmond Kentucky, this facility has been home to over 500 tons of chemical weaponry ranging from mustard gas to VX nerve agent. Like Pine Bluff it is an extremely vast site that encompasses 14,600 acres (59 km^{2}) of land. The storage began in the 1940s with mustard gases and was greatly expanded in the 1960s with GB and VX (O-ethyl S-methylphosphonothioate or nerve agent) <Blue Grass Army Depot, 2005>. Blue Grass Army Depot was the final location with declared chemical weapons remaining. It completed destruction of the chemical weapons on July 7, 2023.

=== Johnston Atoll ===
Johnston Atoll is an island territory owned by the United States approximately 1,400 miles (2,300 km) west of Hawaii. The island began as a site to test nuclear weapons in the 1950s and 1960s and was later converted to a storage facility for chemical weapons. Currently all of the chemical weapons have been destroyed.

=== Hawaii ===
The U.S. Army dumped 16,000 bombs in deep water 5 miles (8.0 km) south of Pearl Harbor after World War II. Each bomb contained 73 pounds (33 kg) of mustard gas. The Army intends to leave the weapons at the site because moving them could pose more of a threat to people and the environment. A 2010 study led by Margo Edwards indicated that the munitions were not a hazard, but that they were deteriorating and should continue to be monitored. Researchers made 16 dives in submersible vehicles to depths of 2,000 feet (610 m) over three years, locating more than 2,000 munitions. The site is too deep for easy public access, and fishing boats do not trawl near them.

The military used the ocean as a dumping ground for munitions from 1919 to 1970.

=== Anniston Army Depot ===
Located in Alabama, the Anniston Army Depot had stored chemical weapons since the 1960s. It accounted for approximately 7 percent of the United States' stockpile of chemical weaponry. The United States Army began incinerating the stored weapons on August 9, 2003. Currently all of the chemical weapons have been destroyed.

=== Deseret Chemical Depot ===
The Deseret Chemical Depot is located in Tooele, Utah. One of Deseret's primary functions was to store and destroy chemical weapons. At one point the depot stored as much as 44 percent of the nation's entire chemical stockpile. Currently all of the chemical weapons have been destroyed.

=== Umatilla Chemical Depot ===
Located in Oregon, the Umatilla Chemical Depot once maintained and stored 12 percent of the nation’s chemical weapons stockpile. Disposal of the weapons commenced in 2004. The U.S. Army completed chemical agent disposal operations in October 2011.

=== Aberdeen Proving Ground ===
The Aberdeen Proving Ground is an army facility in Maryland. With many components, the facility includes the Edgewood Chemical Activity which was a storage facility for chemical weapons. Currently all of the chemical weapons have been destroyed.

=== Newport Chemical Depot ===
Located in Indiana, the Newport Chemical Depot once stored over 1,000 tons of chemical weapons. Agent destruction operations began in May 2005 and completed in August 2008. NECDF’s permit was officially closed in January 2010.

=== Pueblo Chemical Depot ===
The Pueblo Chemical Depot is located in Colorado and once stored over 2500 tons of chemical weapons. Currently all of the chemical weapons have been destroyed.

== Safety ==
Safety has been the primary concern in all matters pertaining to the destruction of chemical agents. Two years before the U.S. Army began wide scale destruction of chemical agents, they released a "Programmatic Environmental Impact Statement" which considered four possible actions to take pertaining to the chemical weapon stockpiles in the United States. These included: continued storage, destruction at the storage site, development of two main destruction sites then transporting the agents to the sites, or developing a single destruction site to which all chemical weapons would be transported. The Army decided that the safest alternative would be to build eight individual destruction sites at the eight stockpile locations to effectively eliminate the need for transporting any chemical weapons through civilian populations. One month from the date the statement was released that on-site disposal was the safest method this decision was enacted. Many safety precautions are set in place at each disposal site to ensure that any agents released into the environment are well within the safe ranges shown in the table below.

Air and Exposure Standards, Lethal Human Doses
Agent	Workers	Stack Emissions	General Population	Skin, LD(mg/kg)	Intravenous, LD(mg/kg)	Inhalation, LCt(mg-min/m^{3})
GA	0.0001	0.0003	0.000003	14–21	0.014	135–400
GB	0.0001	0.0003	0.000003	24	0.014	70–100
VX	0.00001	0.0003	0.000003	0.04	0.008	20–50
H/HD/HT	0.003	0.03	0.0001	100		10,000

Note: The U.S. Army standards shown in the first three columns set the minimum level of performance required for gas release by an alternative process and are applicable to all four process streams. LCt and LD represent dosage and dose, respectively, that result in 50 percent lethality. Workers column: 8 hour exposure. Stack Emissions column: Maximum concentration in exhaust stack. General Population column: 72 hour exposure. Source: US Army 1974, 1975, 1988; NRC, 1993a.

Each disposal facility is equipped with a cascading negative air system, which ensures that in the event of an accident or structural failure, any chemical agent released stays within the facility. This system is complemented with carbon air filters, which would remove any chemical agents from the air. Structural robustness was ensured during construction with the incinerators being built with 22-inch-thick (560 mm) concrete walls. In addition to the safety precautions at the disposal locations, a significant amount of attention has been directed toward disaster preparedness in the event that the precautions should somehow fail. Millions of dollars of federal funds have been provided to the communities near the disposal sites in the form of communications equipment, emergency operations centers, decontamination equipment, etc. Emergency exercises are conducted, in which both base and community emergency sirens are sounded, to ensure the readiness of response plans in nearby communities. Officials also encourage local families and businesses to be prepared with their own emergency response plans.

If the precautions would somehow fail, human exposure to chemical agents can result in a variety of consequences varying anywhere from mild effects such as minor discomfort to as serious effects, such as death, depending on the agent and dosage. The dosages that humans intake are measured in mg-min/m^{3}. Of the critical three agents, mustard is the least lethal while VX is the most lethal. Mustard is a blistering agent that works to destroy different substances with cells of living tissue. Effects of exposure typically appear within a day. While acute mortality is low, death can occur from long term complications. Humans exposed to a non-disabling dose of 12 mg-min/m^{3} will have signs of mild discomfort and conjunctival injection. With a more disabling dose of 60 mg-min/m^{3}, humans will experience generalized conjunctivitis, edema, photophobia and eye irritation. For a lethal dose, the agent would have to be extremely concentrated as 1500 mg-min/m^{3} give a 50 percent lethality rate. GB or Sarin is the least lethal of the nerve agents. Nerve agents act to disable enzymes responsible for transmitting nerve impulses. Initial effects can appear almost immediately after exposure and can cause death within minutes. Humans exposed to a non-disabling dose which would be about .05 mg/m^{3} for twenty minutes, can experience headaches, eye pain, tightness in chest, rhinorrhea, cramps, nausea, malaise and miosis. With a slightly more potent dose of .05 mg/m^{3} for 30 minutes effects include inhibition, dyspnea and electromyelographic changes. The required dose for a rate of 50 percent lethality is 70 mg-min/m^{3}. VX is also another nerve agent like GB but is much more lethal. At the non-disabling and disabling levels, VX causes the same effects as GB but at much lower doses, 12 times less than that of GB. Also, a mere 30 mg-min/m^{3} will give a death rate of 50 percent.

== Effects on local communities ==
=== Jobs ===
The chemical weapons disposal program has had a huge impact on communities surrounding the disposal sites. In the communities around Pine Bluff, residents are relieved that the threat of chemical exposure from the stockpile is over. However, with the project now completed, many people stand to lose their jobs. The Pine Bluff Chemical Activity issued 180-day layoff notices to many employees on February 1, 2010. In all, the region stands to lose an estimated 970 jobs at the Pine Bluff disposal site. In order to soften the blow to local communities, Pine Bluff Arsenal opened a Transition Center on November 4, 2009. Employees will be given information on educational and workforce training opportunities, retirement counseling, job placement assistance, free access to government human resource personnel and resume writing assistance.

=== Equipment and funding ===
In addition to providing jobs, millions of dollars has been allocated to communities for equipment to increase preparedness in the event of a chemical disaster. This equipment is now the property of the agencies and organizations it was purchased for and will continue to benefit the communities for years to come.
