= Tanya Atwater =

American geophysicist and marine geologist

Tanya Marie Atwater
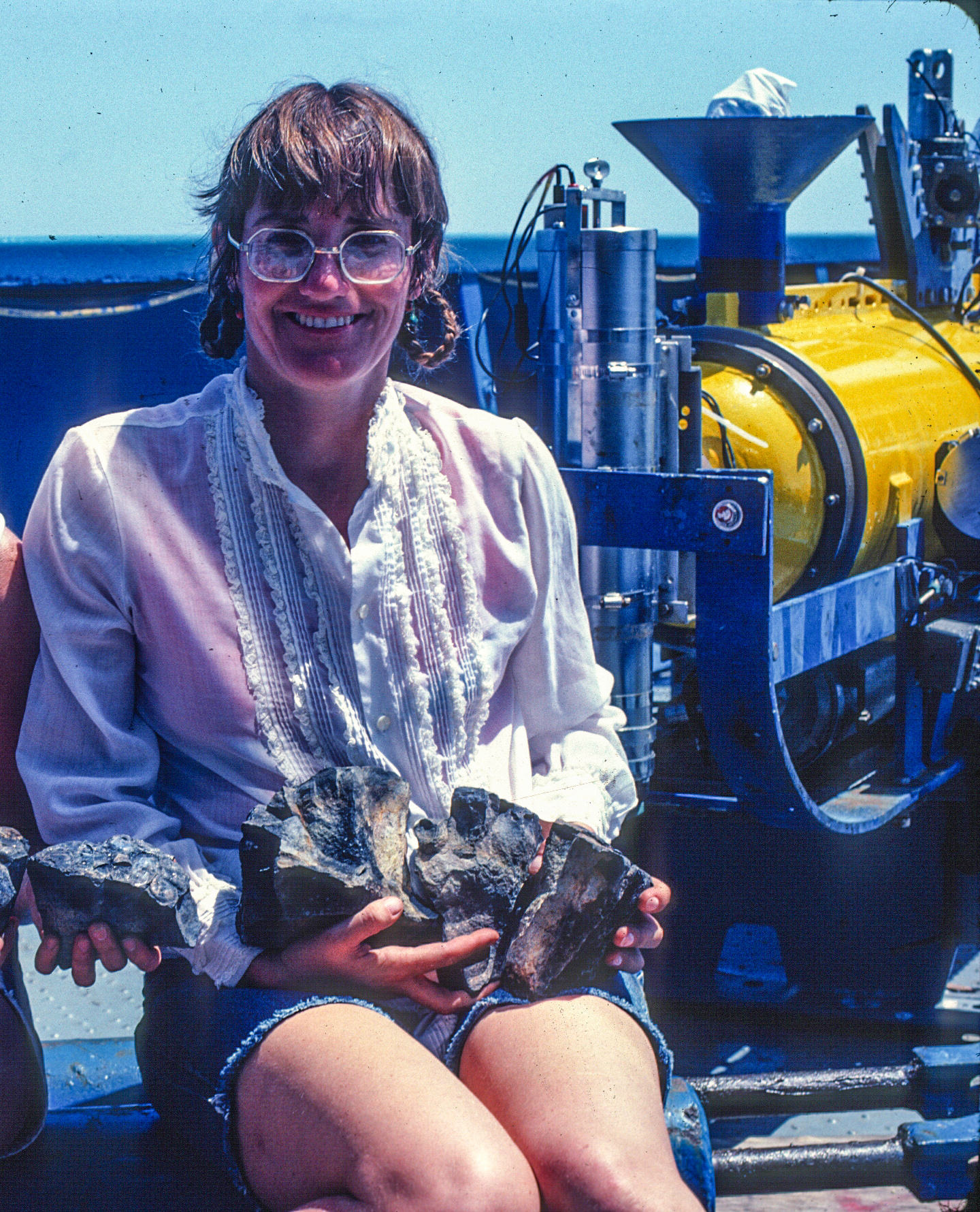
- Tanya Atwater on the Galapagos Propagating Rift expedition, 1982.
- Born: 1942 (age 83–84); Los Angeles, California
- Education: Scripps Institution of Oceanography
- Scientific career
- Fields: Tectonics Marine geology Marine geophysics
- Workplaces: University of California, Santa Barbara
- Thesis: Implications of Plate Tectonics for the Cenozoic Tectonic Evolution of Western North America (1972)

Tanya Atwater (born 1942) is an American geophysicist and marine geologist who specializes in plate tectonics. She is particularly renowned for her early research on the plate tectonic history of western North America.

== Early life and education ==
Atwater was born in Los Angeles, California in 1942. Her father was an engineer and her mother was a botanist. Atwater was one of the first women to research the ocean floor in terms of its geology.

Atwater began her education in 1960 at the Massachusetts Institute of Technology, then received her B.A. in geophysics from the University of California, Berkeley in 1965. She earned a Ph.D. (1972) in marine geophysics from Scripps Institution of Oceanography, University of California, San Diego. She is director of the University of California, Santa Barbara Educational Multimedia Visualization Center where she is an emerita professor of geological sciences. She was a professor at the Massachusetts Institute of Technology before joining the faculty at UCSB in 1980. Atwater retired from UCSB in 2007.

== Career ==
Atwater was a professor of tectonics, in the Department of Geological Sciences, now the Department of Earth Science, at the University of California, Santa Barbara before retiring. She authored and co-authored some 50 articles in international journals, professional volumes, and major reports. Seven of these papers were published in the journals Nature or Science. In 1975, she became a Fellow of the American Geophysical Union for her work in tectonophysics. From 1975 to 1977, Atwater was a Sloan Postdoctoral Fellowship Recipient in Physics. In 1984, she won the Encouragement Award from the Association for Women Geoscientists. Atwater is a member of the U.S. National Academy of Sciences elected for her contributions to marine geophysics and tectonics. In 2019 she received the highest award of the Geological Society of America, the Penrose Medal. In 2022 she received the Wollaston Medal from the Geological Society of London, its highest award.

=== Scientific discoveries ===
Atwater was involved in oceanographic expeditions using deep towed instruments to explore the ocean floor. To date, she has participated in 12 deep water dives in the deep-ocean submersible Alvin. She researched the volcano-tectonic processes responsible for creating new oceanic crust at seafloor spreading centers. In 1968, she co-authored a research paper featuring groundbreaking work into the faulted nature of spreading centers. With Jack Corliss, Fred Spiess, and Kenneth Macdonald, she played key roles in expeditions that uncovered the distinct biology of ocean floor warm springs, which led to the discovery during the RISE project of the high temperature black smokers, undersea hydrothermal vents.

In Atwater's research on propagating rifts near the Galapagos Islands, she discovered that propagating rifts were created when spreading centers along the seafloor were disturbed by tectonic movement or magma and therefore had to change direction to realign. This helped to explain the complex pattern of the seafloor.

Atwater is perhaps best known for her work on the plate tectonic history of western North America. She wrote two major research papers outlining the history of plate tectonic evolution of North America and tectonic problems of the San Andreas Fault, which assisted in documenting the history of the San Andreas Fault.

She also studied geometric evolution, integrating and comparing the global plate motion records with the regional continental geologic records. She found emerging relationships that revealed the origins of many large-scale geologic features (e.g. Rocky Mountains, Yellowstone, Death Valley, Cascade volcanoes, California Coast Ranges).

Atwater's research paper, "Implications of Plate Tectonics for the Cenozoic Tectonic Evolution of Western North America", established the essential framework for the plate tectonics of western North America. In her work, she explains that approximately 40 million years ago, the Farallon plate was subducting underneath the North American plate and the Pacific plate. The lower half of the Farallon plate was entirely subducted under Southern California and the upper half did not sink, which eventually became known as the Juan de Fuca plate. Since the southern section of Farallon completely disappeared, the boundary of southern California was now between the Pacific plate and the North American plate. The San Andreas Fault is unique because it acts as a major fault line as well as a border between the Pacific plate and the North American plate. She updated this work in 1989.

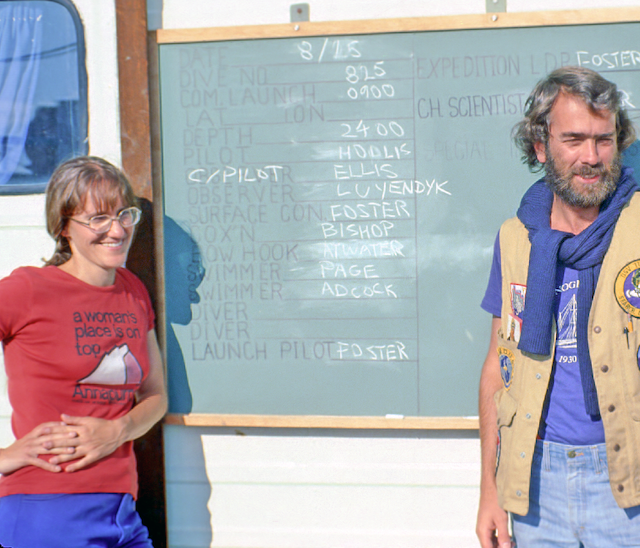
Chief Scientist Tanya Atwater and Bruce P. Luyendyk, ALVIN expedition to Mid-Atlantic Ridge, 1978

Atwater is interested in communication and education at all levels. She has developed electronic multi-media (Educational Multimedia Visualization Center at UCSB) to enhance geologic visualization and understanding, particularly related to the histories of tectonic plates.

== Awards and honors ==
- 1975, Fellow, American Geophysical Union
- 1980, AAAS Newcomb Cleveland Prize for top research article in the journal Science
- 1997, elected to the National Academy of Sciences
- 2002, National Science Foundation Director's Award for Distinguished Teaching Scholars. This award, of $300,000 over four years, is given to help and honor distinguished scientists who are working out ways to translate research into education. The money is meant to provide teaching scholars the opportunity to expand their work beyond their home institutions.
- Leopold von Buch Medal, German Geosciences Society
- 2005 Gold Medal, Society of Woman Geographers
- 2019 Penrose Medal of the Geological Society of America.
- 2022 Wollaston Medal of the Geological Society of London.
- 2023 Elected to the American Academy of Arts and Sciences.

== Selected works ==
- Menard, H. W.; Atwater, Tanya (1968). "Changes in Direction of Sea Floor Spreading". Nature. 219 (5153). Springer Science and Business Media LLC: 463–467. Bibcode:1968Natur.219..463M. doi:10.1038/219463a0. ISSN 0028-0836. S2CID 38388804.
- Atwater, Tanya (1970). "Implications of Plate Tectonics for the Cenozoic Tectonic Evolution of Western North America". Geological Society of America Bulletin. 81 (12). Geological Society of America: 3513. doi:10.1130/0016-7606(1970)81[3513:ioptft]2.0.co;2. ISSN 0016-7606.
- Atwater, Tanya, and P. Molnar, 1973, Relative motion of the Pacific and North American plates deduced from seafloor spreading in the Atlantic, Indian and South Pacific Oceans. R. L. Kovach and A. Nur, eds., Proc. of the Conf. on Tectonic Problems of the San Andreas Fault, Geological Sciences, v. XIII, Stanford Univ., p. 136-148. Reprinted in U.C.S.D., Scripps Inst. Oceanography., Contributions, Vol. 44, Part 2, p. 1362–1374, 1974.
- Atwater, Tanya (1981). "Propagating rifts in seafloor spreading patterns". Nature. 290 (5803). Springer Science and Business Media LLC: 185–186. Bibcode:1981Natur.290..185A. doi:10.1038/290185a0. ISSN 0028-0836. S2CID 4366184.
- Severinghaus, Jeff; Atwater, Tanya (1990). "Chapter 1: Cenozoic geometry and thermal state of the subducting slabs beneath western North America". Geological Society of America Memoirs. Vol. 176. Geological Society of America. pp. 1–22. doi:10.1130/mem176-p1. ISBN 0-8137-1176-2. ISSN 0072-1069.
- Atwater, T., 1991, Tectonics of the Northeast Pacific, Transactions of the Royal Society of Canada, Series I, v. I, pp. 295–318.
- Atwater, T., 1998, Plate Tectonic History of Southern California with emphasis on the Western Transverse Ranges and Santa Rosa Island, in Weigand, P. W., ed., Contributions to the geology of the Northern Channel Islands, Southern California: American Association of Petroleum Geologists, Pacific Section, MP 45, p. 1-8.

== See also ==
- Triple junction
- Project FAMOUS
