= Dawn Wright =

American geographer and oceanographer

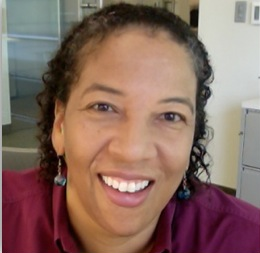
- Wright in 2016
- Born: April 15, 1961 (age 65)
- Education: Wheaton College (BS); Texas A&M University (MS); University of California, Santa Barbara (PhD)
- Scientific career
- Fields: Geography, Oceanography
- Workplaces: Esri; Oregon State University
- Doctoral advisor: Raymond Smith
- Other academic advisors: Michael Frank Goodchild; Kenneth C. Macdonald; Rachel Haymon

Dawn Jeannine Wright (born April 15, 1961) is an American geographer and oceanographer. She is a leading authority in the application of geographic information system (GIS) technology to the field of ocean and coastal science and played a key role in creating the first GIS data model for the oceans. Wright is Chief Scientist of the Environmental Systems Research Institute (Esri). She has also been a professor of geography and oceanography at Oregon State University since 1995 and is a former Oregon Professor of the Year as named by the Council for the Advancement and Support of Education and the Carnegie Foundation for the Advancement of Teaching. Wright was the first Black female to dive to the ocean floor in the deep submersible ALVIN. On July 12, 2022, she became the first and only Black person to dive to Challenger Deep, the deepest point on Earth, and to successfully operate a side scan sonar at full-ocean depth.

== Early life and education ==
Wright graduated with a Bachelor of Science cum laude in geology from Wheaton College in 1983, earned a Master of Science in oceanography from Texas A&M University in 1986, and an Individual Interdisciplinary Ph.D. in Physical Geography and Marine Geology from University of California, Santa Barbara in 1994. In 2007, she received a Distinguished Alumna Award from UCSB and was also a commencement speaker for UCSB College of Letters and Science.

== Career ==
Wright's research interests include mapping of seafloor spreading zones and coral reefs, spatial analysis and geographic information systems as applied to the marine environment. Wright co-edited one of the first books on marine GIS and is widely known as one of the most influential researchers within her fields. Another influential work is an article published in 1997, which was widely cited for its analysis of the perception of GIS among geographers in the early 1990s.

Wright began her career as a seagoing marine technician for the Ocean Drilling Program, sailing on ten 2-month expeditions from 1986 to 1989 aboard the JOIDES Resolution, mostly throughout the Indian and Pacific Oceans. Her most prominent service has included the National Academy of Sciences Ocean Studies Board, the Science Advisory Board of NOAA, the Science Advisory Board of the EPA, the National Council of the American Association of Geographers, and Research Chair and Board Member of the University Consortium for Geographic Information Science. A strong advocate of STEM as well as science communication, she has been profiled by outlets such as (www.womenoceanographers.org), The Oceanography Society, The Atlantic, NOAA's Sea Grant Program, NOAA's National Marine Sanctuaries Program, Science magazine, Harvard Design magazine, Environment, Coastal & Offshore (ECO) magazine, The HistoryMakers, Let Science Speak, COMPASS Blogs, Ensia, Nature News, BBC radio and a host of student projects.

Wright is a member of several editorial boards including GigaScience, Geography Compass, Journal of Coastal Conservation, The Anthropocene Review, Annals of the American Association of Geographers, International Journal of Geographical Information Science, Marine Geodesy, and Transactions in GIS.

In 2018, Wright appeared in the Tribeca Film Festival in the short film series "Let Science Speak."

== Awards and honors ==
Wright is an elected member of the National Academy of Sciences, the National Academy of Engineering and the American Academy of Arts and Sciences, a fellow of the American Association for the Advancement of Science and of the Aldo Leopold Leadership Program. Other honors include:

- NCSE Friend of the Planet Award (2024)
- Distinguished Alumni Award, UC Santa Barbara
- Fellow, The Oceanography Society, 2020
- Geosciences Innovator Award, Texas A&M University College of Geosciences, 2019
- Fellow of the California Academy of Sciences, 2018
- Steinbach Visiting Scholar (at-large), MIT/WHOI Joint Program in Oceanography/Applied Ocean Science & Engineering, 2018
- 18th Roger Revelle Commemorative Lecturer, National Academy of Sciences Ocean Studies Board, 2017
- Fellow of the Geological Society of America, 2016
- Randolph W. “Bill” and Cecile T. Bromery Award for Minorities, Geological Society of America, 2015
- Leptoukh Lecture Award, Earth and Space Science Informatics Focus Group, American Geophysical Union (AGU), 2015
- Distinguished Teaching Honors, Association of American Geographers (now the American Association of Geographers), 2013
- Presidential Achievement Award, Association of American Geographers (now the American Association of Geographers), 2012
- Milton Harris Award for Excellence in Basic Research, OSU College of Science, 2005
- NSF CAREER Award, 1995

== Selected publications ==
Wright has authored nearly 100 peer-reviewed journal articles and 12 books. A selection is listed here.

- Earle, Sylvia; Wright, Dawn; Joye, Samantha; Laffoley, Dan; Baxter, John; Safina, Carl; Elkus, Patricia (2018). "Ocean deoxygenation: Time for action". Science. 359 (6383): 1475–1476. Bibcode:2018Sci...359.1475E. doi:10.1126/science.aat0167. PMID 29599234. S2CID 206666825.
- Wright, Dawn (2017). "Swells, soundings, and sustainability, but... here be monsters". Oceanography. 30 (2): 90–103. doi:10.5670/oceanog.2017.207.
- Wright, Dawn (2016). Ocean Solutions, Earth Solutions (2nd ed.). Redlands, CA: Esri Press. p. 500. ISBN 9781589484603.
- Wright, Dawn J.; et al. (1997). "Demystifying the persistent ambiguity of GIS as "tool" versus "science,"". Annals of the Association of American Geographers. 87 (2): 346–362. doi:10.1111/0004-5608.872057.
- Wright, Dawn; et al. (1995). "Crustal fissuring and its relationship to magmatic and hydrothermal processes on the East Pacific Rise crest (9° 12' - 54'N)". Journal of Geophysical Research. 100 (B4): 6097–6210. Bibcode:1995JGR...100.6097W. doi:10.1029/94jb02876. S2CID 59400668.

== Diversity and Inclusion ==
Wright is a member of the American Geophysical Union's Diversity and Inclusion Advisory Committee. She is also a supporter and participant in the Black in Marine Science organization.

== See also ==
- List of people who descended to Challenger Deep
