= SCICEX =

U.S. Navy research program in collaboration with academic researchers

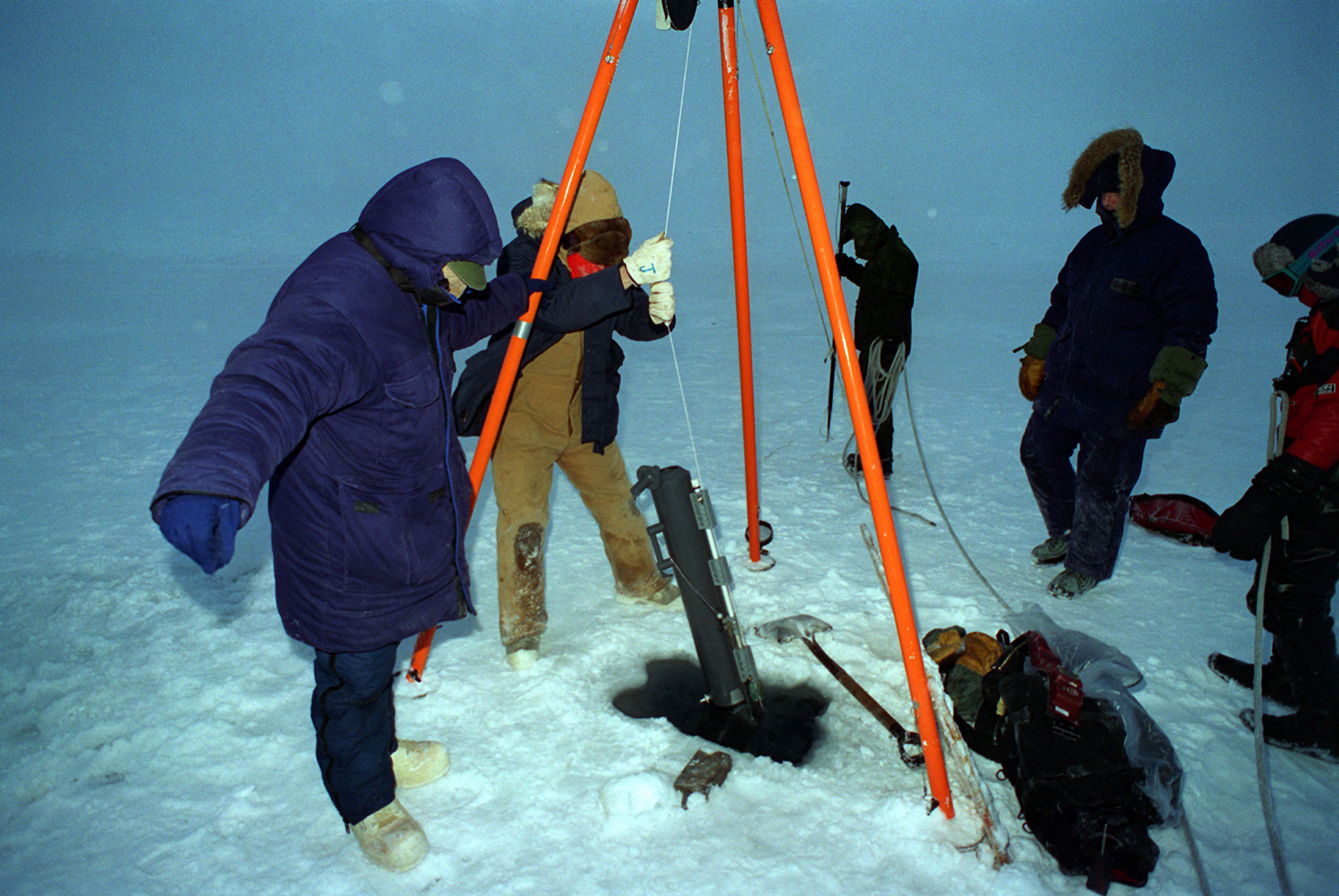
Deploying a Niskin bottle during SCICEX/96

SCICEX, standing for Scientific Ice Expeditions, was a five-year (1995–1999) scientific research program involving a collaboration between the U.S. Navy and academic researchers from a variety of different universities. The object of study was geophysical and oceanological conditions in the Arctic Ocean. The Navy made available a nuclear submarine for each research cruise.

Margo Edwards was the chief scientist for the 1999 expedition and spent thirteen days on the USS Hawkbill, thereby becoming the first woman to live aboard a Navy nuclear submarine during under-ice operations. Edwards' research found evidence of climate change in the Arctic, including thinning sea ice, volcanoes on the seafloor, and warm water moving into the Arctic from the Atlantic Ocean. These data are available for anyone to view.

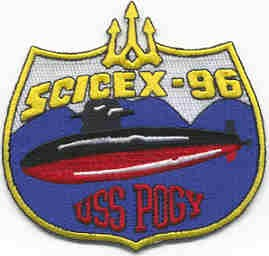
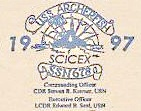
Navy patch for 96 expedition and logo for 97 expedition

== List of Expeditions ==
- SCICEX/93 · USS Pargo
- SCICEX/95 · USS Cavalla
- SCICEX/96 · USS Pogy
- SCICEX/97 · USS Archerfish
- SCICEX/98 · USS Hawkbill
- SCICEX/99 · USS Hawkbill
