= Seafloor depth versus age =

Term in geology

The depth of the seafloor on the flanks of a mid-ocean ridge is determined mainly by the age of the oceanic lithosphere; older seafloor is deeper. Taking the square root of an age derived from the summation of time-consuming processes such as seafloor spreading, lithosphere and mantle cooling, contraction, and isostatic adjustment results in a highly accurate seafloor depth. This relationship has come to be better understood since around 1969 with significant updates in 1974 and 1977. Two main theories have been put forward to explain this observation: one where the mantle including the lithosphere is cooling; the cooling mantle model, and a second where a lithosphere plate cools above a mantle at a constant temperature; the cooling plate model. The cooling mantle model explains the age-depth observations for seafloor younger than 80 million years. The cooling plate model explains the age-depth observations best for seafloor older that 20 million years. In addition, the cooling plate model explains the almost constant depth and heat flow observed in very old seafloor and lithosphere. In practice it is convenient to use the solution for the cooling mantle model for an age-depth relationship younger than 20 million years. Older than this the cooling plate model fits data as well. Beyond 80 million years the plate model fits better than the mantle model.

== Background ==
The first theories for seafloor spreading in the early and mid twentieth century explained the elevations of the mid-ocean ridges as upwellings above convection currents in Earth's mantle.

The next idea connected seafloor spreading and continental drift in a model of plate tectonics. In 1969, the elevations of ridges was explained as thermal expansion of a lithospheric plate at the spreading center. This 'cooling plate model' was followed in 1974 by noting that elevations of ridges could be modeled by cooling of the whole upper mantle including any plate. This was followed in 1977 by a more refined plate model which explained data that showed that both the ocean depths and ocean crust heat flow approached a constant value for very old seafloor. These observations could not be explained by the earlier 'cooling mantle model' which predicted increasing depth and decreasing heat flow at very old ages.

== Seafloor topography: cooling mantle and lithosphere models ==
The depth of the seafloor (or the height of a location on a mid-ocean ridge above a base-level) is closely correlated with its age (i.e. the age of the lithosphere at the point where depth is measured). Depth is measured to the top of the ocean crust, below any overlying sediment. The age-depth relation can be modeled by the cooling of a lithosphere plate or mantle half-space in areas without significant subduction. The distinction between the two approaches is that the plate model requires the base of the lithosphere to maintain a constant temperature over time and the cooling is of the plate above this lower boundary. The cooling mantle model, which was developed after the plate model, does not require that the lithosphere base is maintained at a constant and limiting temperature. The result of the cooling mantle model is that seafloor depth is predicted to be proportional to the square root of its age.

=== Cooling mantle model (1974) ===
In the cooling mantle half-space model developed in 1974, the seabed (top of crust) height is determined by the oceanic lithosphere and mantle temperature, due to thermal expansion. The simple result is that the ridge height or seabed depth is proportional to the square root of its age. In all models, oceanic lithosphere is continuously formed at a constant rate at the mid-ocean ridges. The source of the lithosphere has a half-plane shape (x = 0, z < 0) and a constant temperature T_{1}. Due to its continuous creation, the lithosphere at x > 0 is moving away from the ridge at a constant velocity $v$, which is assumed large compared to other typical scales in the problem. The temperature at the upper boundary of the lithosphere (z = 0) is a constant T_{0} = 0. Thus at x = 0 the temperature is the Heaviside step function $T_1\cdot\Theta(-z)$. The system is assumed to be at a quasi-steady state, so that the temperature distribution is constant in time, i.e. $T=T(x,z).$

Derivation of the mathematical model for a cooling mantle

By calculating in the frame of reference of the moving lithosphere (velocity $v$), which has spatial coordinate $x' = x-vt,$ $T=T(x',z, t).$ and the heat equation is:

$$\frac{\partial T}{\partial t} = \kappa \nabla^2 T = \kappa\frac{\partial^2 T}{\partial^2 z} + \kappa\frac{\partial^2 T}{\partial^2 x'}$$

where $\kappa$ is the thermal diffusivity of the mantle lithosphere.

Since T depends on x' and t only through the combination $x = x'+vt,$:

$$\frac{\partial T}{\partial x'} = \frac{1}{v}\cdot\frac{\partial T}{\partial t}$$

Thus:

$$\frac{\partial T}{\partial t} = \kappa \nabla^2 T = \kappa\frac{\partial^2 T}{\partial^2 z} + \frac{\kappa}{v^2} \frac{\partial^2 T}{\partial^2 t}$$

It is assumed that $v$ is large compared to other scales in the problem; therefore the last term in the equation is neglected, giving one-dimensional diffusion equation:

$$\frac{\partial T}{\partial t} = \kappa\frac{\partial^2 T}{\partial^2 z}$$

with the initial conditions

$$T(t=0) = T_1\cdot\Theta(-z).$$

The solution for $z\le 0$ is given by the error function:

$$T(x',z,t) = T_1 \cdot \operatorname{erf} \left(\frac{z}{2\sqrt{\kappa t}}\right)$$.

Due to the large velocity, the temperature dependence on the horizontal direction is negligible, and the height at time t (i.e. of sea floor of age t) can be calculated by integrating the thermal expansion over z:

$$h(t) = h_0 + \alpha_\mathrm{eff} \int_0^{\infty} [T(z)-T_1]dz = h_0 - \frac{2}{\sqrt{\pi}}\alpha_\mathrm{eff}T_1\sqrt{\kappa t}$$

where $\alpha_\mathrm{eff}$ is the effective volumetric thermal expansion coefficient, and h_{0} is the mid-ocean ridge height (compared to some reference).

The assumption that $v$ is relatively large is equivalent to the assumption that the thermal diffusivity $\kappa$ is small compared to $L^2/A$, where L is the ocean width (from mid-ocean ridges to continental shelf) and A is the age of the ocean basin.

The effective thermal expansion coefficient $\alpha_\mathrm{eff}$ is different from the usual thermal expansion coefficient $\alpha$ due to isostasic effect of the change in water column height above the lithosphere as it expands or contracts. Both coefficients are related by:

$$\alpha_\mathrm{eff} = \alpha \cdot \frac{\rho}{\rho-\rho_w}$$

where $\rho \sim 3.3 \ \mathrm{g}\cdot \mathrm{cm}^{-3}$ is the rock density and $\rho_0 = 1 \ \mathrm{g} \cdot \mathrm{cm}^{-3}$ is the density of water.

By substituting the parameters by their rough estimates into the solution for the height of the ocean floor $h(t)$:

$$\begin{align}
\kappa &\sim 8\cdot 10^{-7} \ \mathrm{m}^2\cdot \mathrm{s}^{-1}&& \text{for the thermal diffusivity} \\
\alpha &\sim 4\cdot 10^{-5} \ {}^{\circ}\mathrm{C}^{-1}&& \text{for the thermal expansion coefficient} \\
T_1 &\sim 1220 \ {}^{\circ}\mathrm{C} && \text{for the Atlantic and Indian oceans} \\
T_1 &\sim 1120 \ {}^{\circ}\mathrm{C} && \text{for the eastern Pacific}
\end{align}$$

we have:

$$h(t) \sim \begin{cases} h_0 - 390 \sqrt{t} & \text{for the Atlantic and Indian oceans} \\ h_0 - 350 \sqrt{t} & \text{for the eastern Pacific} \end{cases}$$

where the height is in meters and time is in millions of years. To get the dependence on x, one must substitute t = x/$v$ ~ Ax/L, where L is the distance between the ridge to the continental shelf (roughly half the ocean width), and A is the ocean basin age.

Rather than height of the ocean floor $h(t)$ above a base or reference level $h_b$, the depth of the seabed $d(t)$ is of interest. Because $d(t)+h(t)=h_b$(with $h_b$ measured from the ocean surface) we can find that:

$d(t)=h_b-h_0+350\sqrt{t}$; for the eastern Pacific for example, where $h_b-h_0$ is the depth at the ridge crest, typically 2500 m.

=== Cooling plate model (1977) ===
The depth predicted by the square root of seafloor age found by the 1974 cooling mantle derivation is too deep for seafloor older than 80 million years. Depth is better explained by a cooling lithosphere plate model rather than the cooling mantle half-space. The plate has a constant temperature at its base and spreading edge. Derivation of the cooling plate model also starts with the heat flow equation in one dimension as does the cooling mantle model. The difference is in requiring a thermal boundary at the base of a cooling plate. Analysis of depth versus age and depth versus square root of age data allowed Parsons and Sclater to estimate model parameters (for the North Pacific):

~125 km for lithosphere thickness
$T_1\thicksim1350\ {}^{\circ}\mathrm{C}$ at base and young edge of plate
$$\alpha\thicksim3.2\cdot 10^{-5} \ {}^{\circ}\mathrm{C}^{-1}$$

Assuming isostatic equilibrium everywhere beneath the cooling plate yields a revised age-depth relationship for older sea floor that is approximately correct for ages as young as 20 million years:

$d(t)=6400-3200\exp\bigl(-t/62.8\bigr)$ meters

Thus older seafloor deepens more slowly than younger and in fact can be assumed almost constant at ~6400 m depth. Their plate model also allowed an expression for conductive heat flow, q(t) from the ocean floor, which is approximately constant at $1\cdot 10^{-6}\mathrm{cal}\, \mathrm{cm}^{-2} \mathrm{sec}^{-1}$ beyond 120 million years:

$$q(t)=11.3/\sqrt{t}$$

Parsons and Sclater concluded that some style of mantle convection must apply heat to the base of the plate everywhere to prevent cooling down below 125 km and lithosphere contraction (seafloor deepening) at older ages. Morgan and Smith showed that the flattening of the older seafloor depth can be explained by flow in the asthenosphere below the lithosphere.

The age-depth-heat flow relationship continued to be studied with refinements in the physical parameters that define ocean lithospheric plates.

== Impacts ==
The usual method for estimating the age of the seafloor is from marine magnetic anomaly data and applying the Vine-Matthews-Morley hypothesis. Other ways include expensive deep sea drilling and dating of core material. If the depth is known at a location where anomalies are not mapped or are absent, and seabed samples are not available, knowing the seabed depth can yield an age estimate using the age-depth relationships.

Along with this, if the seafloor spreading rate in an ocean basin increases, then the average depth in that ocean basin decreases and therefore its volume decreases (and vice versa). This results in global eustatic sea level rise (fall) because the Earth is not expanding. Two main drivers of sea level variation over geologic time are then changes in the volume of continental ice on the land, and the changes over time in ocean basin average depth (basin volume) depending on its average age.

== See also ==
- Sea level
- Sea-level curve
- Sea level equation
- Sea level rise
