= Project FAMOUS =

Marine scientific exploration (1971–1974)

Project FAMOUS study area on Mid-Atlantic Ridge

Project FAMOUS (French-American Mid-Ocean Undersea Study) was the first-ever marine scientific exploration by manned submersibles of a diverging tectonic plate boundary on a mid-ocean ridge. It took place between 1971 and 1974, with a multi-national team of scientists concentrating numerous underwater surveys on an area of the Mid-Atlantic Ridge about 700 kilometers (380 nautical miles) west of the Azores. By deploying new methods and specialized equipment, scientists were able to look at the sea floor in far greater detail than ever before. The project succeeded in defining the main mechanisms of creation of the median rift valley on the Mid-Atlantic Ridge, and in locating and mapping the zone of oceanic crustal accretion.

== Study area ==
The Project FAMOUS study area was located on a section of the Mid-Atlantic Ridge about 700 kilometers (380 nautical miles) west of the Azores (Sao Miguel) at 36° 50’ north latitude. It includes a 30–32 km (16–17 nmi)-wide median valley or rift valley on the crest of the Mid-Atlantic Ridge that trends slightly east of north. Within the median valley lies the present boundary between the North American and African tectonic plates. The floor of the rift valley is 2,400–2,500 m (7,900–8,200 ft) deep and 1 to 3 km (0.54 to 1.62 nmi) wide and the bounding rift mountains are at a depth of about 1,300 m (4,300 ft), or about 1 km (3,300 ft) above the floor. The rift valley is 40 km (22 nmi) long and it is offset to the eastward in the north at Fracture Zone A; in the south, it is offset westward at Fracture Zone B.

== Methodology ==
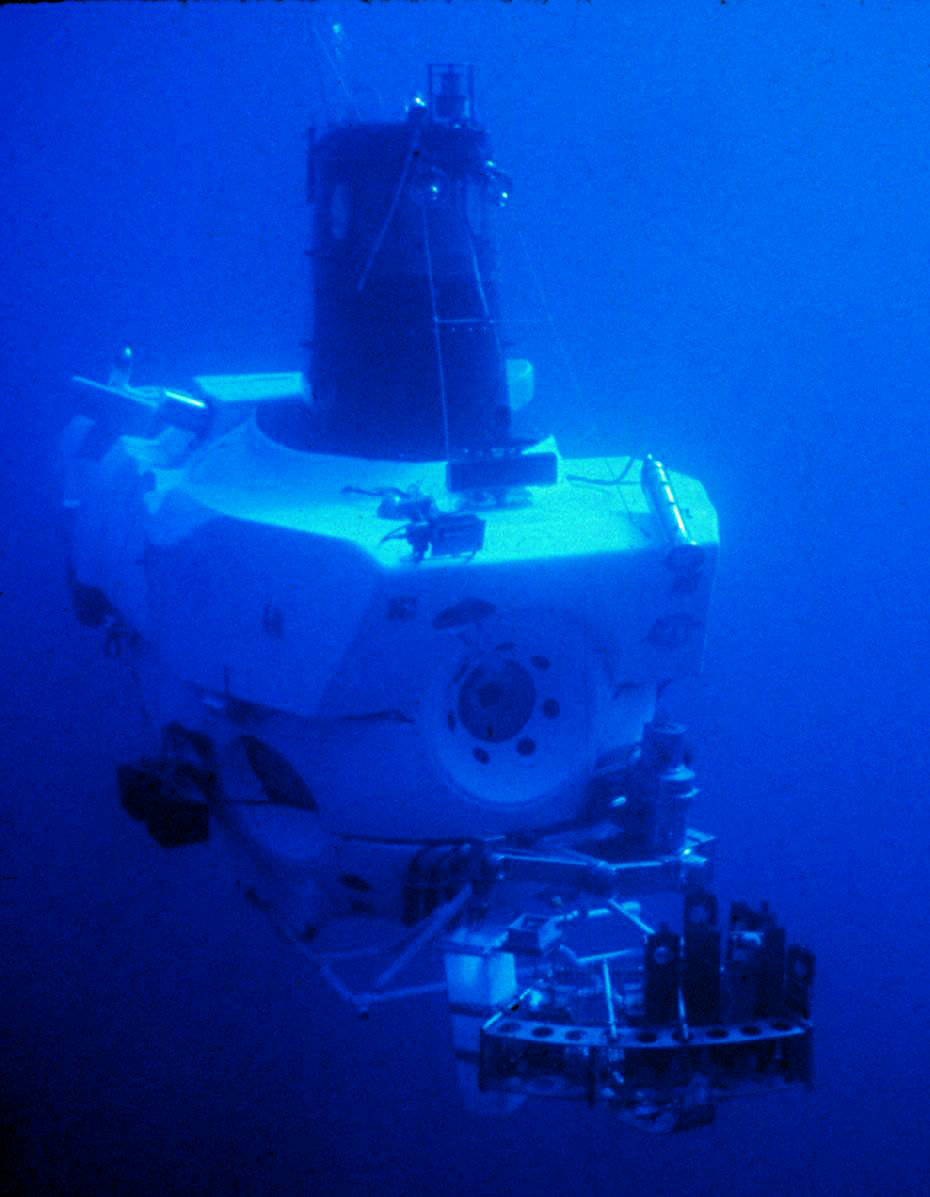
ALVIN submersible of Woods Hole Oceanographic Institution in 1978

A significant obstacle in marine surveys was the use of echo sounders with a wide transmit beam, which smeared-out details of the sea floor features. The crustal accretion or creation process was thought to take place over a few kilometers width of sea floor, which was below the resolution of ship echo sounders. Thus, near-bottom and on-bottom approaches were employed along with new sonar mapping tools. Investigations included airborne magnetics, advanced surface ship sonar, and geophysical measurements, seismology, deep-towed instruments, large format bottom photography, fixed on-bottom instruments, and on-bottom dives with research manned submersibles in the rift valley of the Mid-Atlantic Ridge. The Woods Hole Oceanographic Institution (WHOI) in Massachusetts provided surface ships and the submersible ALVIN; the French provided surface ships and the bathyscaph Archimède and submersible CYANA. The British conducted side scan sonar surveys and on-bottom seismic experiments. Lead institutions were WHOI and the French Centre Oceanologique de Bretagne, Brest, France. Project leaders were James Heirtzler, Claude Riffaud, and Xavier Le Pichon.

Detail of bathymetry in FAMOUS area

=== Operational challenges ===
In the 1960s, Canadian scientists had begun a detailed study of the Mid-Atlantic Ridge at a latitude of 45° N that included multiple expeditions by surface ships. With Project FAMOUS located on the ridge in more clement latitudes around 37° N, a coordinated multi-national, multi-ship series of more than twenty expeditions took place over four years, between 1971 and 1974. Bilateral briefing meetings were held as new expeditions were completed. The unique operational features of Project FAMOUS included the use of newly developed narrow-beam and multibeam echo sounders along with deeply-towed instruments and manned submersibles to achieve a new, higher level of resolution of a spreading center. Key to this approach was improved ship navigation with transit satellites to allow detailed mapping, in an era before GPS. This was augmented by use of acoustic on-bottom transponder navigation of ships, instruments, and submersibles. Besides the approach using instruments with increasing detailed resolution, the submersible divers were trained to recognize the volcanic terrain they could encounter through prior field exercises undertaken in Iceland and Hawaii. The pressure hull of the ALVIN submersible was also specially upgraded to allow it to reach the great depths of the rift valley. In total, forty-four dives with the three submersibles were completed over dive seasons in 1973 and 1974.

== Main results ==
Project FAMOUS represented a new experimental approach to sea floor geology and was considered a major technical achievement at the time. The demonstration of the viability of sea floor observations by submersibles made possible the subsequent discoveries of hydrothermal vents at the Galapagos spreading center and on the East Pacific Rise at 21° N.

The project succeeded in defining the morphology and structure of the spreading center or median rift valley along with locating the zone of crustal accretion in the median valley floor. On the large scale, sonar mapping and deep-tow instrument surveys found that the median valley is asymmetric in shape with the rift mountains on the west about 11 km from the deepest part of the valley floor, and those on the east about 20 km from it. This finding indicated that seafloor spreading here is not the same on either side of the valley floor as might be expected with the most simple idea of the process. Instead, the computed rate is 7 mm/year to the west and 13.4 mm/year to the east. The higher resolution surveys were able to establish that the median valley is formed by faulting and not volcanism. In the FAMOUS area the median valley displays four provinces: the outer walls of the valley, which are normal faults with vertical movements that border the rift mountains; a mostly level terrace of varied width below these walls; inner walls to the valley floor that are also normal faults, and the relatively narrow median valley or rift valley floor at the deepest point. The heights of the rift mountains diminish away from the median valley by additional systems of faults that decrease rather than increase relief.

Deeply towed geophysical instruments explored the rift valley floor where most of the dives took place. These efforts observed the zone of crustal accretion aligned along the center of the valley floor. In the FAMOUS area valley floor the accretion zone is marked by several low and elongate volcanic hills about 100–250 m high and 1–2 km long. These are bordered by a fissured terrane where the crust is cracked. Divers observed that these hills are constructed mainly of pillow lavas that are without sediment cover, indicating they are new or young. Sediment covers most of the inner valley floor away from these hills indicating accretion is not taking place beyond the hills. Conceptual models suggest that volcanism within the valley floor is cyclic or episodic, with volcanic activity recurring every 5,000 to 10,000 years. The observed continuous background seismicity infers that faulting is continual and ongoing.

In the fracture zones explored by dives and deep towed instruments, shear zones a few meters wide were found. These mark the transform faults between adjacent spreading centers and rift valleys. Because the fracture zones are up to 10 km wide in places, this observation indicates the shear zone or transform fault, migrates over time within the fracture zone itself. The bounding fracture zones, A and B are not orthogonal or perpendicular to the rift valley as is expected for transform faults and spreading ridge connections. This has led to the notion that spreading here is oblique to the trend of the rift valley. However. the near-bottom and on-bottom observations find that the narrow shear zones are in fact at right angles to the rift valley trend as would be required by plate tectonics.

The observation of pervasive faulting and fracturing of the crust indicated the spreading center was under tension; thus revealing that the driving force for plate motion was a pulling apart of the plates rather than a pushing apart from the mantle below.

These observations; of the architecture of the median valley, of the fracture zone transform faults, and of the crustal accretion zone, mark the first ground-truth data of plate boundaries for a slow rate spreading center.

== See also ==
- Tanya Atwater
- Robert Ballard
- IFREMER – Institute of French researches for the exploitation of maritime environment
- Bruce Luyendyk
- Kenneth C. Macdonald
- Fred Spiess
- Underwater acoustic positioning system
