= RISE project =

1979 international marine research project

RISE and RITA project region

The RISE Project (Rivera Submersible Experiments) was a 1979 international marine research project which mapped and investigated seafloor spreading in the Pacific Ocean, at the crest of the East Pacific Rise (EPR) at 21° north latitude. Using a deep sea submersible (ALVIN) to search for hydrothermal activity at depths around 2600 meters, the project discovered a series of vents emitting dark mineral particles at extremely high temperatures which gave rise to the popular name, "black smokers". Biologic communities found at 21° N vents, based on chemosynthesis and similar to those found at the Galápagos spreading center, established that these communities are not unique. Discovery of a deep-sea ecosystem not based on sunlight spurred theories of the origin of life on Earth.

== Location ==
The RISE expedition took place on the East Pacific Rise spreading center at depths around 2,600 meters (8,500 ft), at 21° north latitude about 200 kilometers (110 nautical miles) south of Baja California, and 350 kilometers (190 nautical miles) southwest of Mazatlán, Mexico. The study area at 21° N was selected following results from a series of detailed near-bottom geophysical surveys that were designed to map the geologic features associated with a known spreading center.

== Experiments ==
The project objective was detecting and mapping the sub-seafloor magma chamber that feeds lavas and igneous intrusions that create the oceanic crust and lithosphere in the process of seafloor spreading. The approach comprised many geophysical techniques including seismology, magnetism, crustal electrical properties, and gravity. The major experiment effort though, was seafloor observation and sample collection using the deep submergence submersible ALVIN on the crest of the EPR at depths of 2600 meters or more.

RISE was part of the RITA (Rivera-Tamayo expeditions) project, which included submersible investigations (CYAMEX) at 21° N and at the Tamayo Fracture zone at the mouth of the Gulf of California. The RITA project used the French submersible CYANA on the CYAMEX expeditions. CYANA dives at 21° N occurred in 1978, one year prior to the RISE expedition.

== Participants ==
American, French, and Mexican biologists, geologists, and geophysicists participated in both the RISE and RITA expeditions. The RISE expedition was directed by scientists at the Scripps Institution of Oceanography, part of the University of California, San Diego. Project leaders were Fred Spiess and Ken Macdonald. Woods Hole Oceanographic Institution provided the ALVIN and its support tender the catamaran Lulu. Scripps provided surface survey vessels the Melville and New Horizon. The expedition took place during March to May 1979. The RITA Project was directed by French scientists and was led by Jean Francheteau.

== Findings ==
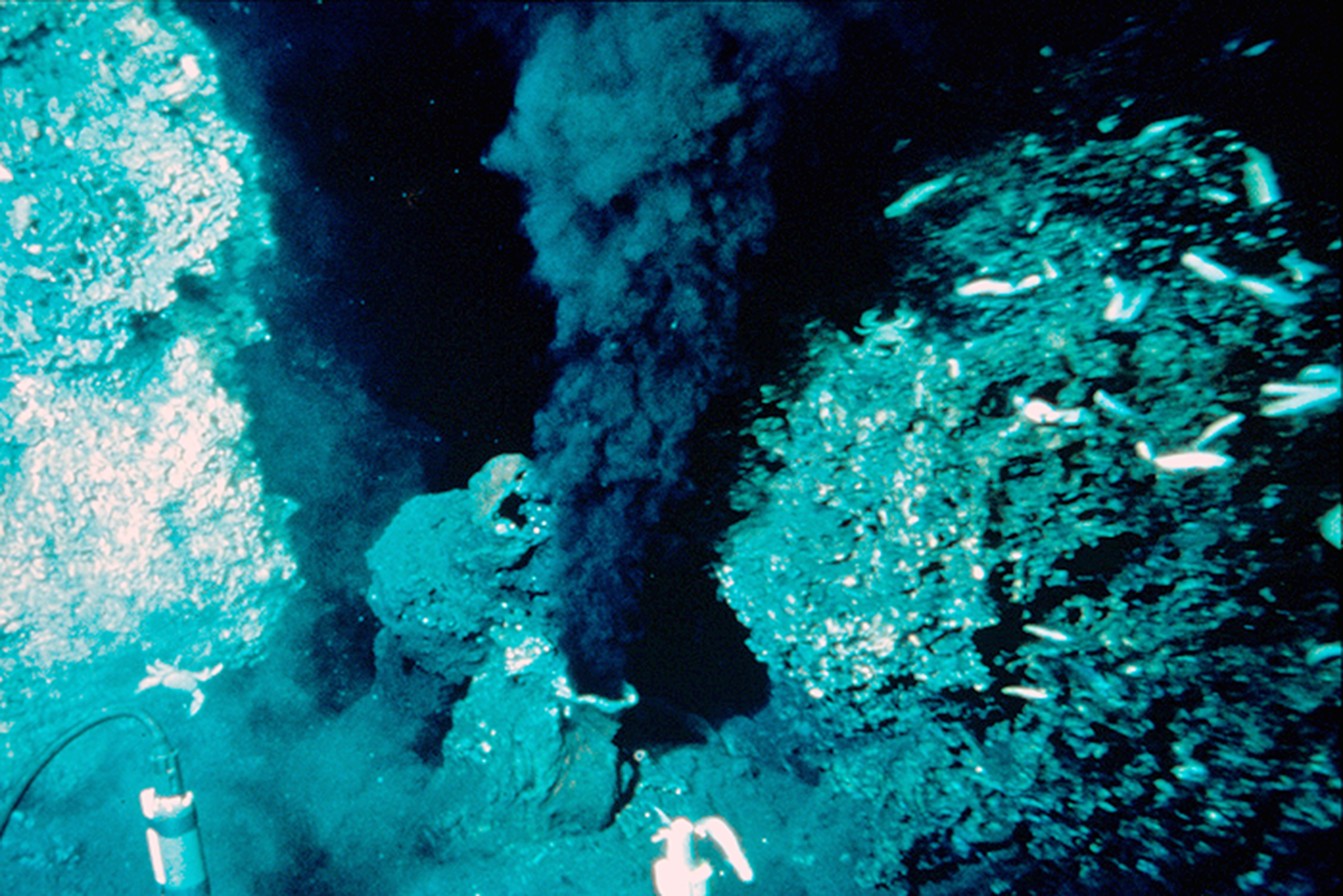
Black smokers were first discovered on the East Pacific Rise at 21° north latitude.

The major finding of the RISE project was discovery of very hot hydrothermal fluids emanating from the sea floor from vents at separate locations along the crest of the rise. These were anticipated by the discovery during the CYAMEX expedition a year earlier of massive sulfide mineral deposits on the sea floor at 21°N, which were presumed to be due to hydrothermal activity, but which was not then observed. During RISE dives, the hot vents were found and were marked by mineralized chimneys, about a half-meter in diameter and one to a few meters high, composed of sulfide minerals of zinc, copper and iron. Emitting from the chimneys were black plumes or jets of fine particles of these minerals, giving rise to the popular name "black smokers". Temperatures measured of these jets were 380±30 °C. Several vents of lower temperature emissions were found (<23 °C). These warm vents were similar to those discovered at the Galapagos Spreading Center a few years earlier. Hot vents and black smokers were not found at the Galapagos. Modeling of gravity data measured on the seafloor suggested that much of the upper ocean crust at 21°N was fractured and filled with warm water.

== Scientific impact ==
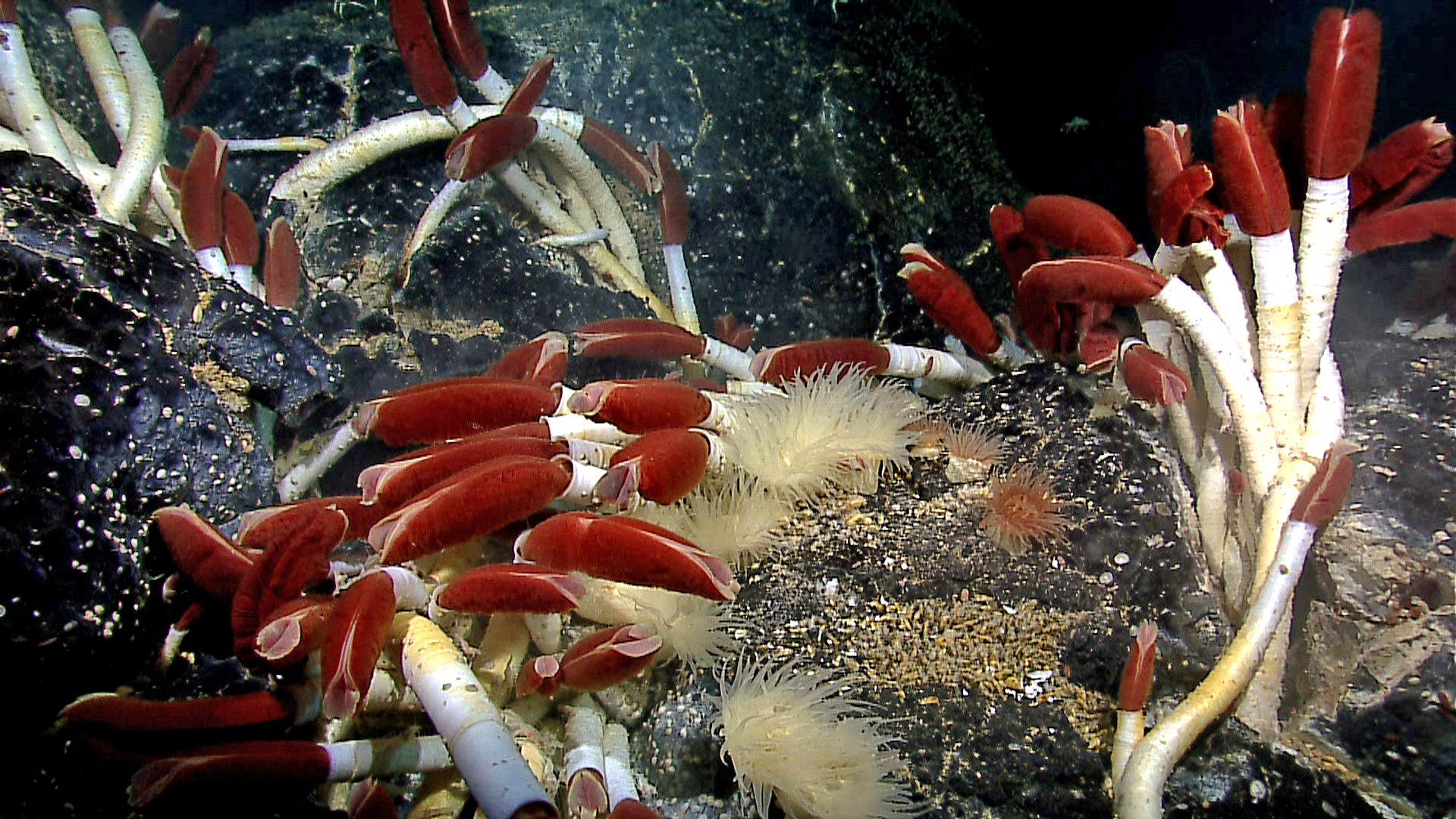
Riftia tube worm colony at warm vent at Galapagos Rift

Massive sulfide deposits have been mined on land in places including Cyprus, Oman and Australia. The discovery of massive sulfide deposits associated with vent fields at spreading centers provided a model for how these deposits formed. It also spurred commercial efforts to mine these deep sea deposits found elsewhere.

Marine geologists were puzzled for years by conductive heat flow data from the seafloor that showed the measured values at spreading centers were too low for theoretical models of seafloor spreading. The convective crustal heat transfer computed for the first time from the vent plumes was estimated to be many-fold the observed conductive heat flow at a spreading center. These observations pointed to the importance of convective heat flow at spreading centers and provided an answer to the low heat flow problem.

The discovery of biological communities at low temperature warm vents at 21°N, populated by a benthic community the same or similar to that discovered at the Galapagos spreading center, established that life forms found at the Galapagos were not unique. Further, the significance of discovering at the Galapagos site and 21°N of a chemosynthetic ecosystem that was not dependent on sunlight, existed at high pressures, and was based on chemicals emitted via volcanism, provided a model for how life could have originated on Earth.

== See also ==
- Tanya Atwater
- Robert Ballard
- Jack Corliss
- Rachel Haymon
- Miriam Kastner
- Bruce P. Luyendyk
- Endeavor Hydrothermal Vents
- Magic Mountain (vents offshore British Columbia, Canada)
- Rivera Plate
