= Suzanne Carbotte =

Marine geologist

Suzanne Marie Carbotte
- Education: University of California
- Scientific career
- Thesis: Tectonic and magnetic studies of mid-ocean ridges : evolution of ridge segmentation and deformation of newly formed crust at slow to fast spreading centers. (1992)
- Doctoral advisor: Ken C. Macdonald

Suzanne Carbotte is a marine geophysicist known for her research on the formation of new oceanic crust.

== Education and career ==
Carbotte has an H.B.Sc in geology and physics from the University of Toronto (1982). Following college, she went to art school before starting at Queen's University where she earned an M.Sc. geophysics in 1986. In 1992, she earned her Ph.D. in marine geophysics from the University of California. Carbotte started at Lamont–Doherty Earth Observatory as a post-doctoral research fellow and in 2007 she was named the Bruce C. Heezen Senior Scientist.

In 2015, Carbotte was elected a fellow of the American Geophysical Union, and the citation reads:

For seminal contributions to understanding the global mid-ocean ridge system and the formation and evolution of the oceanic crust.

== Research ==
Carbotte uses sonar to map the seafloor and applies the resulting data to understanding of how tectonic plates move over time and space. She has characterized spreading of tectonic plates in regions characterized by fast versus slow spreading rates, and conducted research on the East Pacific Rise and the Juan de Fuca Ridge. In the Cascadia Subduction Zone off the western coast of the United States, Carbotte uses seismic data to examine water and sediments found within oceanic crust, and quantifies the level of stress in different regions of the tectonic plates. In 2021, Carbotte lead a cruise on the RV Marcus G. Langseth to estimate the scale of earthquakes in the Pacific Northwest with a particular focus on why the tectonic plates in the region have been unexpectedly quiet in recent geological time.

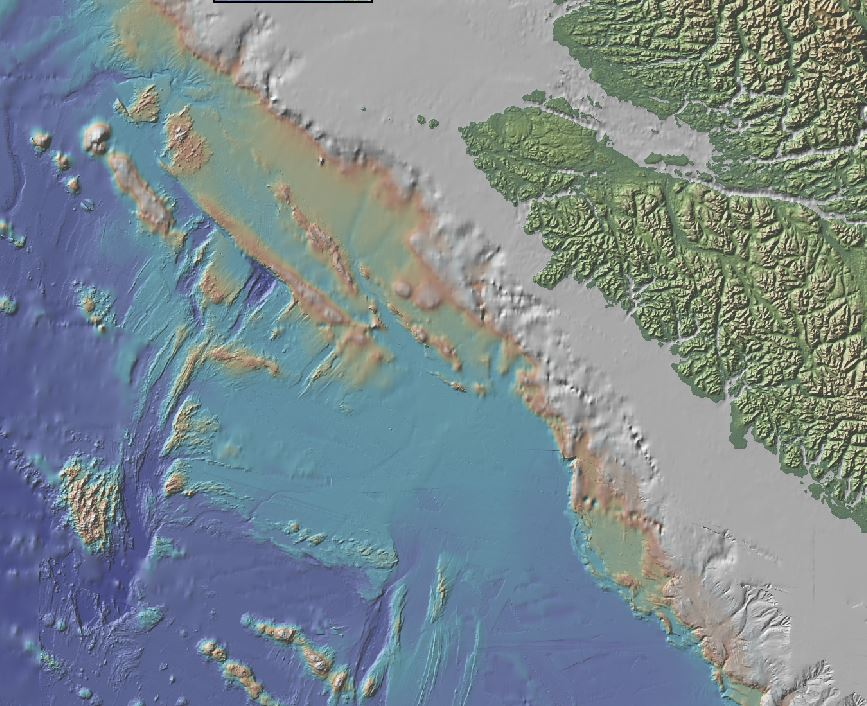
Section of data from the Marine Geoscience Data System map showing the Explorer Plate off the coast of Oregon and Washington, United States.

Carbotte also works to retain scientific data and make it readily-available to the public. Her work with the Global Multi-Resolution Topography (GMRT) is a Digital Elevation Model that provides high resolution maps of the seafloor on global scales. She has worked within the confines of the Marine Geoscience Data System generating data during the Ridge 2000 program, data from Antarctica and the Southern Ocean, and within the United States Antarctic Program Data Center

=== Selected publications ===
- Carbotte, Suzanne M.; Macdonald, Ken C. (1994-07-10). "Comparison of seafloor tectonic fabric at intermediate, fast, and super fast spreading ridges: Influence of spreading rate, plate motions, and ridge segmentation on fault patterns". Journal of Geophysical Research: Solid Earth. 99 (B7): 13609–13631. Bibcode:1994JGR....9913609C. doi:10.1029/93JB02971.
- Carbotte, Suzanne M.; Detrick, Robert S.; Harding, Alistair; Canales, Juan Pablo; Babcock, Jeffrey; Kent, Graham; Ark, Emily Van; Nedimovic, Mladen; Diebold, John (2006). "Rift topography linked to magmatism at the intermediate spreading Juan de Fuca Ridge". Geology. 34 (3): 209. Bibcode:2006Geo....34..209C. doi:10.1130/G21969.1. ISSN 0091-7613.
- Ryan, William B. F.; Carbotte, Suzanne M.; Coplan, Justin O.; O'Hara, Suzanne; Melkonian, Andrew; Arko, Robert; Weissel, Rose Anne; Ferrini, Vicki; Goodwillie, Andrew; Nitsche, Frank; Bonczkowski, Juliet (2009). "Global Multi-Resolution Topography synthesis: GLOBAL MULTI-RESOLUTION TOPOGRAPHY SYNTHESIS". Geochemistry, Geophysics, Geosystems. 10 (3): n/a. Bibcode:2009GGG....10.3014R. doi:10.1029/2008GC002332.
- Carbotte, Suzanne M.; Marjanović, Milena; Carton, Helene; Mutter, John C.; Canales, Juan Pablo; Nedimović, Mladen R.; Han, Shuoshuo; Perfit, Michael R. (2013). "Fine-scale segmentation of the crustal magma reservoir beneath the East Pacific Rise". Nature Geoscience. 6 (10): 866–870. Bibcode:2013NatGe...6..866C. doi:10.1038/ngeo1933. ISSN 1752-0894.

== Awards and honors ==
- Francis Birch lecture, American Geophysical Union (2008)
- Fellow, American Geophysical Union (2015)
