= Malpelo Ridge =

Volcanic seamount chain on the Nazca plate

The Malpelo Ridge (Spanish: Dorsal de Malpelo) is an elevated part of the Nazca plate off the Pacific coast of Colombia. It is a faulted chain of volcanic rock of tholeiitic composition. The Malpelo Ridge may have originated simultaneously as Carnegie Ridge, and thus represent an old continuation of Cocos Ridge. It is thought to have acquired its present position due to tectonic movements along the Panama fracture zone.
