= Mid-ocean ridge =

Basaltic underwater mountain system formed by plate tectonic spreading

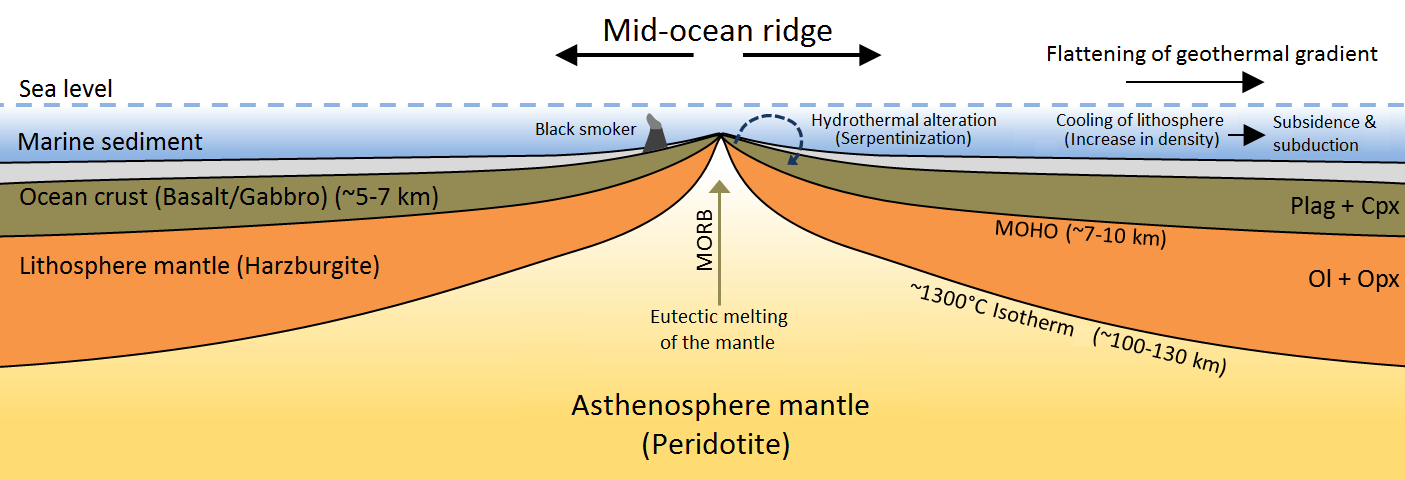
Mid-ocean ridge cross-section (cut-away view)

A mid-ocean ridge (MOR) is a seafloor mountain system formed by plate tectonics. It typically has a depth of about 2,600 meters (8,500 ft) and rises about 2,000 meters (6,600 ft) above the deepest portion of an ocean basin. This feature is where seafloor spreading takes place along a divergent plate boundary. The rate of seafloor spreading determines the morphology of the crest of the mid-ocean ridge and its width in an ocean basin.

The production of new seafloor and oceanic lithosphere results from mantle upwelling in response to plate separation. The melt rises as magma at the linear weakness between the separating plates, and emerges as lava, creating new oceanic crust and lithosphere upon cooling.

The first discovered mid-ocean ridge was the Mid-Atlantic Ridge, which is a spreading center that bisects the North and South Atlantic basins; its location was the reason for the name "mid-ocean ridge". Most oceanic spreading centers are not in the middle of their hosting ocean basins, but are traditionally called mid-ocean ridges regardless.

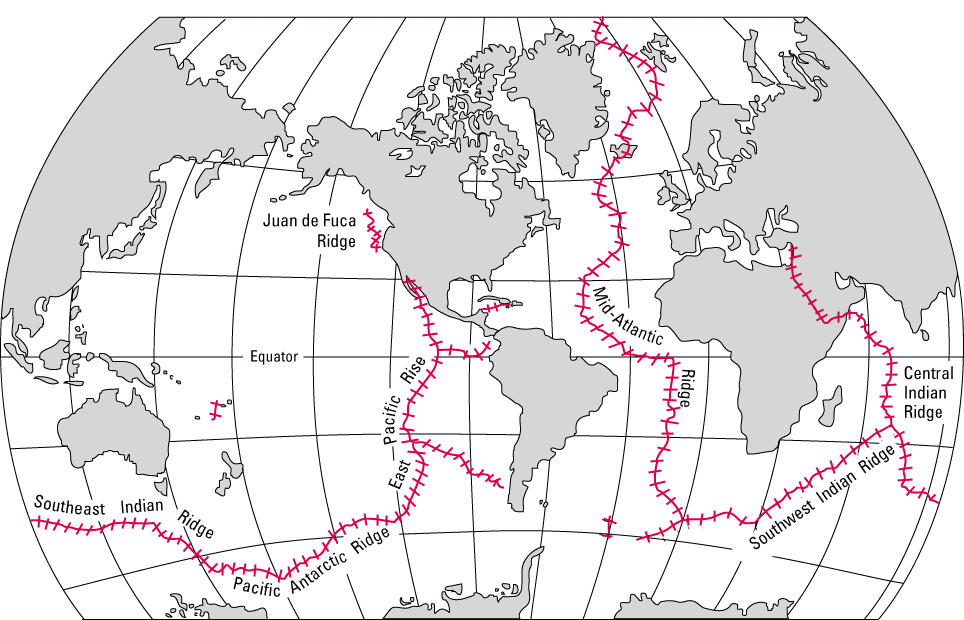
World distribution of mid-oceanic ridges

Mid-ocean ridges around the globe are linked by plate tectonic boundaries and the trace of the ridges across the ocean floor appears similar to the seam of a baseball. Most mid-ocean ridges of the world are connected and form the Ocean Ridge, a global mid-oceanic ridge system that is part of every ocean, making it the longest mountain range in the world. The continuous mountain range is 65,000 km (40,400 mi) long (several times longer than the Andes, the longest continental mountain range), and the total length of the oceanic ridge system is 80,000 km (49,700 mi) long.

== Description ==
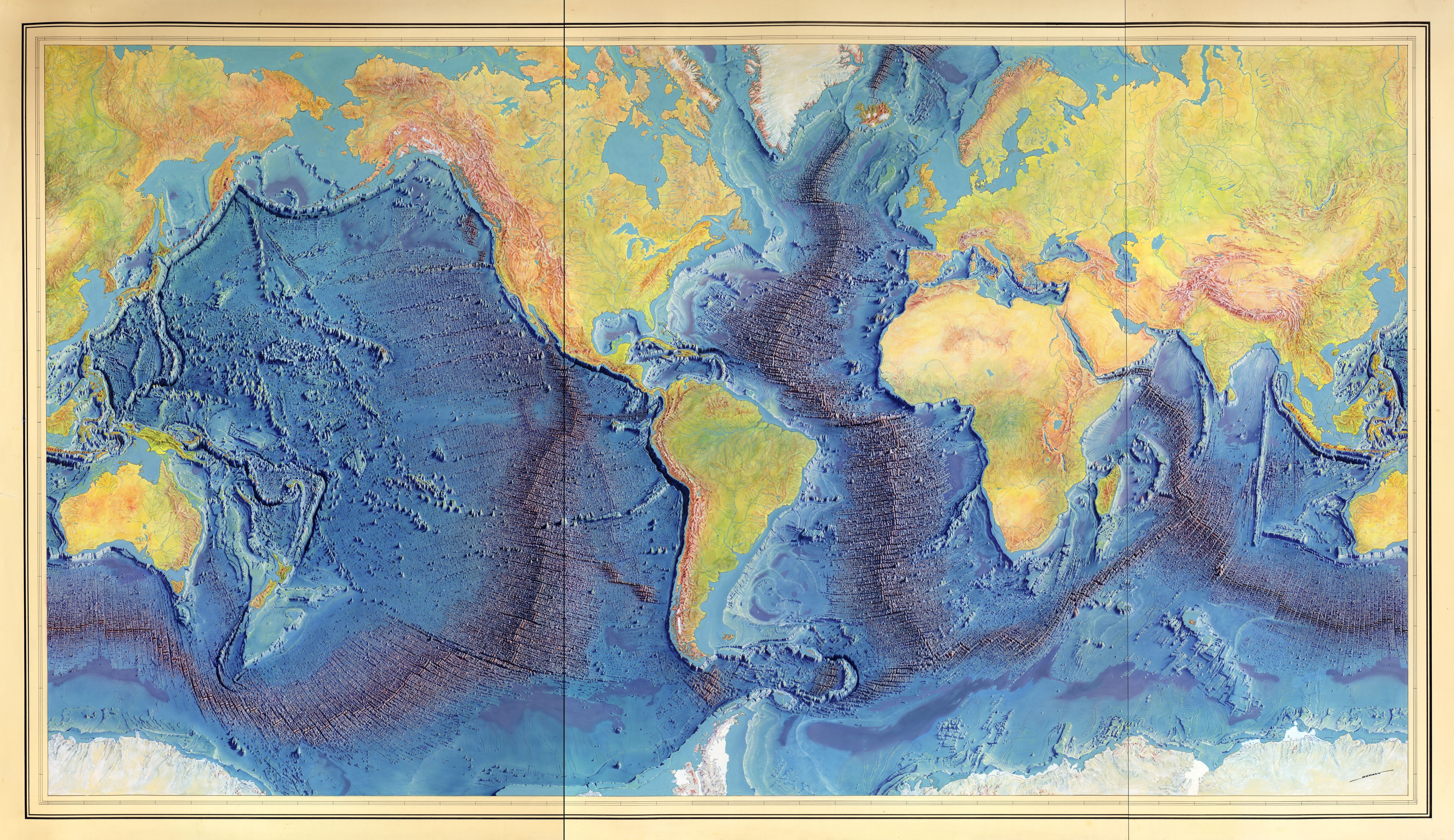
Map of Marie Tharp and Bruce Heezen, painted by Heinrich C. Berann (1977), showing the relief of the ocean floors with the system of mid-ocean ridges

A mid-ocean ridge, with magma rising from a chamber below, forming new oceanic lithosphere that spreads away from the ridge

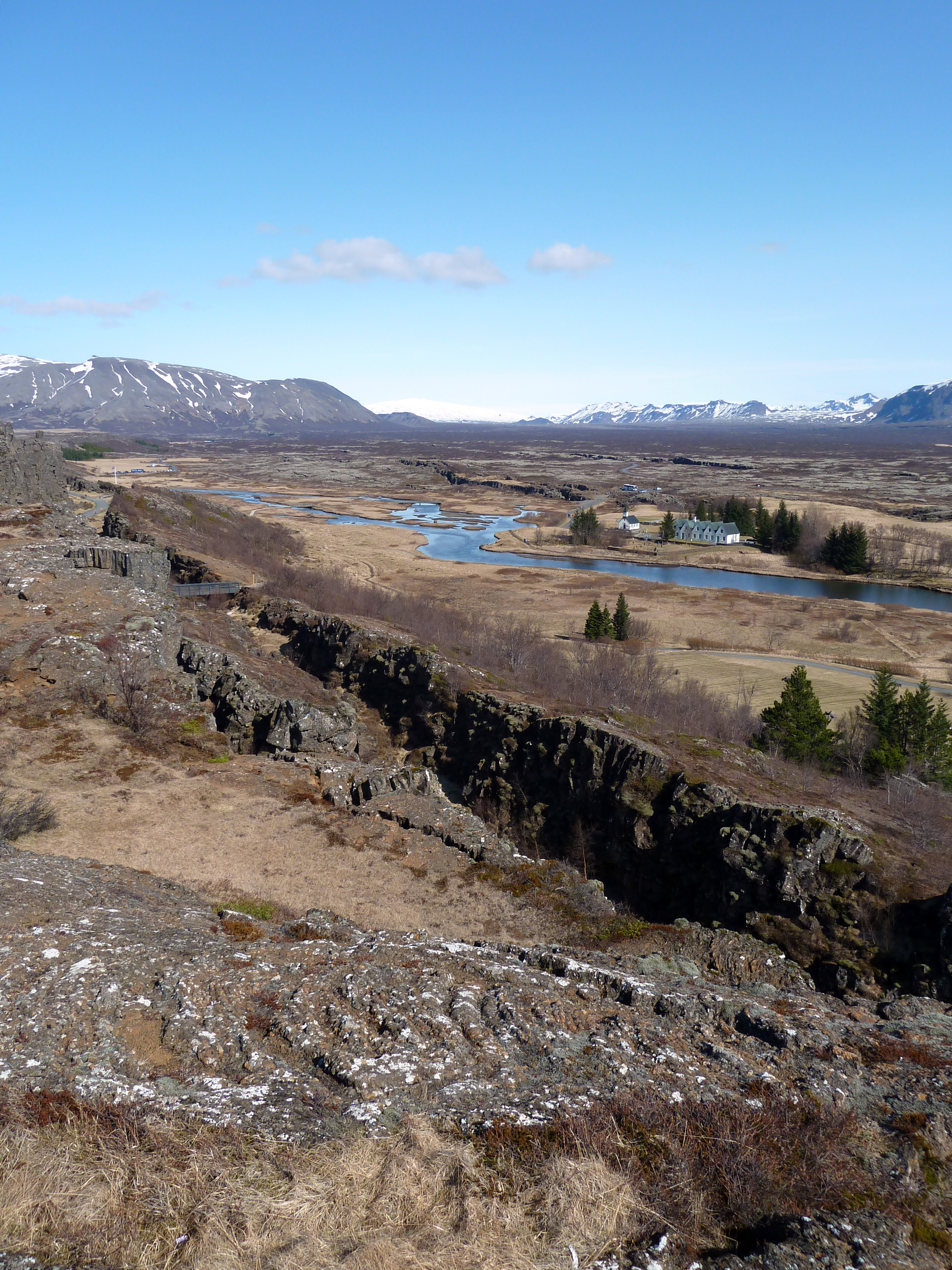
Rift zone in Thingvellir National Park, Iceland. The island is a sub-aerial part of the Mid-Atlantic Ridge, meaning that the ridge rises above sea level here.

=== Morphology ===
At the spreading center on a mid-ocean ridge, the depth of the seafloor is approximately 2,600 meters (8,500 ft). On the ridge flanks, the depth of the seafloor (or the height of a location on a mid-ocean ridge above a base-level) is correlated with its age (age of the lithosphere where depth is measured). The depth-age relation can be modeled by the cooling of a lithosphere plate or mantle half-space. A good approximation is that the depth of the seafloor at a location on a spreading mid-ocean ridge is proportional to the square root of the age of the seafloor. The overall shape of ridges results from Pratt isostasy: close to the ridge axis, there is a hot, low-density mantle supporting the oceanic crust. As the oceanic plate cools, away from the ridge axis, the oceanic mantle lithosphere (the colder, denser part of the mantle that, together with the crust, comprises the oceanic plates) thickens, and the density increases. Thus older seafloor is underlain by denser material and is deeper.

Spreading rate is the rate at which an ocean basin widens due to seafloor spreading. Rates can be computed by mapping marine magnetic anomalies that span mid-ocean ridges. As crystallized basalt extruded at a ridge axis cools below Curie points of appropriate iron-titanium oxides, magnetic field directions parallel to the Earth's magnetic field are recorded in those oxides. The orientations of the field preserved in the oceanic crust comprise a record of directions of the Earth's magnetic field with time. Because the field has reversed directions at known intervals throughout its history, the pattern of geomagnetic reversals in the ocean crust can be used as an indicator of age; given the crustal age and distance from the ridge axis, spreading rates can be calculated.

Spreading rates range from approximately 10–200 mm/yr. Slow-spreading ridges such as the Mid-Atlantic Ridge have spread much less far (showing a steeper profile) than faster ridges such as the East Pacific Rise (gentle profile) for the same amount of time and cooling and consequent bathymetric deepening. Slow-spreading ridges (less than 40 mm/yr) generally have large rift valleys, sometimes as wide as 10–20 km (6.2–12.4 mi), and very rugged terrain at the ridge crest that can have relief of up to 1,000 m (3,300 ft). By contrast, fast-spreading ridges (greater than 90 mm/yr) such as the East Pacific Rise lack rift valleys. The spreading rate of the North Atlantic Ocean is ~ 25 mm/yr, while in the Pacific region, it is 80–145 mm/yr. The highest known rate is over 200 mm/yr in the Miocene on the East Pacific Rise. Ridges that spread at rates <20 mm/yr are referred to as ultraslow spreading ridges (e.g., the Gakkel Ridge in the Arctic Ocean and the Southwest Indian Ridge).

The spreading center or axis commonly connects to a transform fault oriented at right angles to the axis. The flanks of mid-ocean ridges are in many places marked by the inactive scars of transform faults called fracture zones. At faster spreading rates the axes often display overlapping spreading centers that lack connecting transform faults. The depth of the axis changes in a systematic way with shallower depths between offsets such as transform faults and overlapping spreading centers dividing the axis into segments. One hypothesis for different along-axis depths is variations in magma supply to the spreading center. Ultra-slow spreading ridges form both magmatic and amagmatic (currently lack volcanic activity) ridge segments without transform faults.

=== Volcanism ===
Mid-ocean ridges exhibit active volcanism and seismicity. The oceanic crust is in a constant state of 'renewal' at the mid-ocean ridges by the processes of seafloor spreading and plate tectonics. New magma steadily emerges onto the ocean floor and intrudes into the existing ocean crust at and near rifts along the ridge axes. The rocks making up the crust below the seafloor are youngest along the axis of the ridge and age with increasing distance from that axis. New magma of basalt composition emerges at and near the axis because of decompression melting in the underlying Earth's mantle. The isentropic upwelling solid mantle material exceeds the solidus temperature and melts.

The crystallized magma forms a new crust of basalt known as MORB for mid-ocean ridge basalt, and gabbro below it in the lower oceanic crust. Mid-ocean ridge basalt is a tholeiitic basalt and is low in incompatible elements. Hydrothermal vents fueled by magmatic and volcanic heat are a common feature at oceanic spreading centers. A feature of the elevated ridges is their relatively high heat flow values, of about 1–10 μcal/cm^{2}s, or roughly 0.04–0.4 W/m^{2}.

Most crust in the ocean basins is less than 200 million years old, which is much younger than the 4.54 billion year age of Earth. This fact reflects the process of lithosphere recycling into the Earth's mantle during subduction. As the oceanic crust and lithosphere moves away from the ridge axis, the peridotite in the underlying mantle lithosphere cools and becomes more rigid. The crust and the relatively rigid peridotite below it make up the oceanic lithosphere, which sits above the less rigid and viscous asthenosphere.

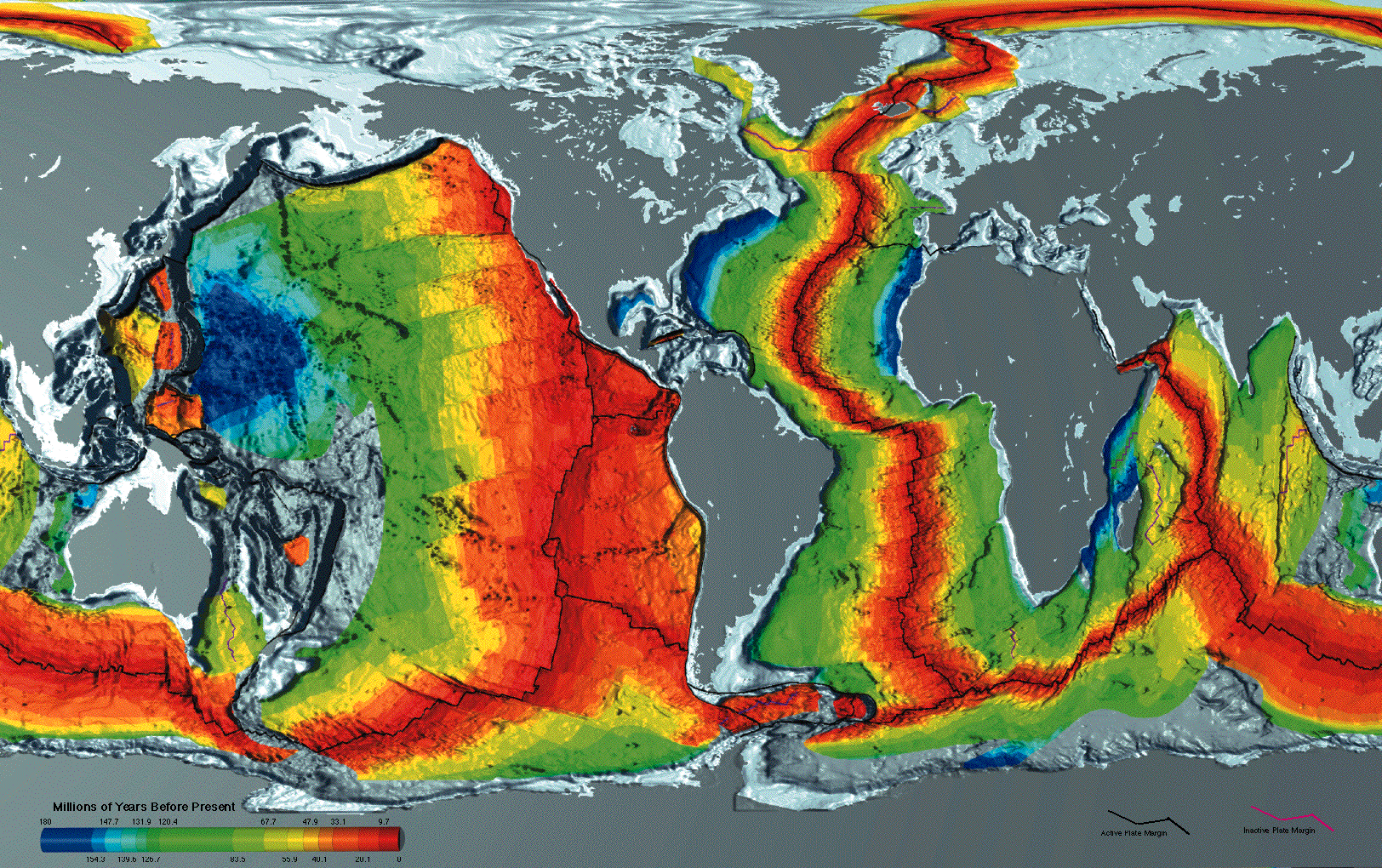
Age of oceanic crust. Red is most recent, and blue is the oldest.

== Driving mechanisms ==
Oceanic crust is formed at an oceanic ridge, while the lithosphere is subducted back into the asthenosphere at trenches.

The oceanic lithosphere is formed at an oceanic ridge, while the lithosphere is subducted back into the asthenosphere at ocean trenches. Two processes, ridge-push and slab pull, are thought to be responsible for spreading at mid-ocean ridges. Ridge push refers to the gravitational sliding of the ocean plate that is raised above the hotter asthenosphere, thus creating a body force causing sliding of the plate downslope. In slab pull the weight of a tectonic plate being subducted (pulled) below an overlying plate at a subduction zone drags the rest of the plate along behind it. The slab pull mechanism is considered to be contributing more than the ridge push.

A process previously proposed to contribute to plate motion and the formation of new oceanic crust at mid-ocean ridges is the "mantle conveyor" due to deep convection (see image). However, some studies have shown that the upper mantle (asthenosphere) is too plastic (flexible) to generate enough friction to pull the tectonic plate along. Moreover, mantle upwelling that causes magma to form beneath the ocean ridges appears to involve only its upper 400 km (250 mi), as deduced from seismic tomography and observations of the seismic discontinuity in the upper mantle at about 400 km (250 mi). On the other hand, some of the world's largest tectonic plates such as the North American plate and South American plate are in motion, yet only are being subducted in restricted locations such as the Lesser Antilles Arc and Scotia Arc, pointing to action by the ridge push body force on these plates. Computer modeling of the plates and mantle motions suggest that plate motion and mantle convection are not connected, and the main plate driving force is slab pull.

== Impact on global sea level ==
Increased rates of seafloor spreading (i.e. the rate of expansion of the mid-ocean ridge) have caused the global (eustatic) sea level to rise over very long timescales (millions of years). Increased seafloor spreading means that the mid-ocean ridge will then expand and form a broader ridge with decreased average depth, taking up more space in the ocean basin. This displaces the overlying ocean and causes sea levels to rise.

Sealevel change can be attributed to other factors (thermal expansion, ice melting, and mantle convection creating dynamic topography). Over very long timescales, however, it is the result of changes in the volume of the ocean basins which are, in turn, affected by rates of seafloor spreading along the mid-ocean ridges.

The 100 to 170 meters higher sea level of the Cretaceous Period (144–65 Ma) is partly attributed to plate tectonics because thermal expansion and the absence of ice sheets only account for some of the extra sea level.

== Impact on seawater chemistry and carbonate deposition ==
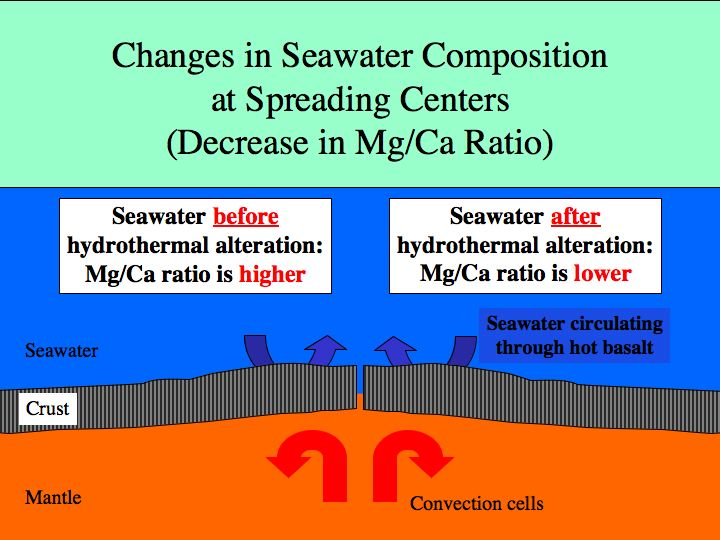
Magnesium/calcium ratio changes at mid-ocean ridges

Seafloor spreading on mid-ocean ridges is a global scale ion-exchange system. Hydrothermal vents at spreading centers introduce various amounts of iron, sulfur, manganese, silicon, and other elements into the ocean, some of which are recycled into the ocean crust. Helium-3, an isotope that accompanies volcanism from the mantle, is emitted by hydrothermal vents and can be detected in plumes within the ocean.

Fast spreading rates will expand the mid-ocean ridge causing basalt reactions with seawater to happen more rapidly. The magnesium/calcium ratio will be lower because more magnesium ions are being removed from seawater and consumed by the rock, and more calcium ions are being removed from the rock and released into seawater. Hydrothermal activity at the ridge crest is efficient in removing magnesium. A lower Mg/Ca ratio favors the precipitation of low-Mg calcite polymorphs of calcium carbonate (calcite seas).

Slow spreading at mid-ocean ridges has the opposite effect and will result in a higher Mg/Ca ratio favoring the precipitation of aragonite and high-Mg calcite polymorphs of calcium carbonate (aragonite seas).

Experiments show that most modern high-Mg calcite organisms would have been low-Mg calcite in past calcite seas, meaning that the Mg/Ca ratio in an organism's skeleton varies with the Mg/Ca ratio of the seawater in which it was grown.

The mineralogy of reef-building and sediment-producing organisms is thus regulated by chemical reactions occurring along the mid-ocean ridge, the rate of which is controlled by the rate of sea-floor spreading.

== History ==
=== Discovery ===
The first indications that a ridge bisects the Atlantic Ocean basin came from the results of the British Challenger expedition in the nineteenth century. Soundings from lines dropped to the seafloor were analyzed by oceanographers Matthew Fontaine Maury and Charles Wyville Thomson and revealed a prominent rise in the seafloor that ran down the Atlantic basin from north to south. Sonar echo sounders confirmed this in the early twentieth century.

It was not until after World War II, when the ocean floor was surveyed in more detail, that the full extent of mid-ocean ridges became known. The Vema, a ship of the Lamont–Doherty Earth Observatory of Columbia University, traversed the Atlantic Ocean, recording echo sounder data on the depth of the ocean floor. A team led by Marie Tharp and Bruce Heezen concluded that there was an enormous mountain chain with a rift valley at its crest, running up the middle of the Atlantic Ocean. Scientists named it the 'Mid-Atlantic Ridge'. Other research showed that the ridge crest was seismically active and fresh lavas were found in the rift valley. Also, crustal heat flow was higher here than elsewhere in the Atlantic Ocean basin.

At first, the ridge was thought to be a feature specific to the Atlantic Ocean. However, as surveys of the ocean floor continued around the world, it was discovered that every ocean contains parts of the mid-ocean ridge system. The German Meteor expedition traced the mid-ocean ridge from the South Atlantic into the Indian Ocean early in the twentieth century. Although the first-discovered section of the ridge system runs down the middle of the Atlantic Ocean, it was found that most mid-ocean ridges are located away from the center of other ocean basins.

=== Impact of discovery: seafloor spreading ===
Alfred Wegener proposed the theory of continental drift in 1912. He stated: "the Mid-Atlantic Ridge ... zone in which the floor of the Atlantic, as it keeps spreading, is continuously tearing open and making space for fresh, relatively fluid and hot sima [rising] from depth". However, Wegener did not pursue this observation in his later works and his theory was dismissed by geologists because there was no mechanism to explain how continents could plow through ocean crust, and the theory became largely forgotten.

Following the discovery of the worldwide extent of the mid-ocean ridge in the 1950s, geologists faced a new task: explaining how such an enormous geological structure could have formed. In the 1960s, geologists discovered and began to propose mechanisms for seafloor spreading. The discovery of mid-ocean ridges and the process of seafloor spreading allowed for Wegener's theory to be expanded so that it included the movement of oceanic crust as well as the continents. Plate tectonics was a suitable explanation for seafloor spreading, and the acceptance of plate tectonics by the majority of geologists resulted in a major paradigm shift in geological thinking.

It is estimated that along Earth's mid-ocean ridges every year 2.7 km^{2} (1.0 mi^{2}) of new seafloor is formed by this process. With a crustal thickness of 7 km (4.3 mi), this amounts to about 19 km^{3} (4.6 mi^{3}) of new ocean crust formed every year.

Oceanic ridge and deep sea vent chemistry

Plates in the crust of the earth, according to the plate tectonics theory

Seafloor magnetic striping

A demonstration of magnetic striping

== List of mid-ocean ridges ==
- Aden Ridge – Rift portion in Gulf of Aden
- Cocos Ridge – Aseismic ridge within the Cocos plate
- Explorer Ridge – Mid-ocean ridge west of British Columbia, Canada
- Cocos–Nazca spreading centre – Spreading centre under central eastern Pacific Ocean
  - Galápagos spreading centre – Western part of the Cocos–Nazca spreading centre
- Gorda Ridge – Tectonic spreading center off the northern coast of California and southern Oregon
- Juan de Fuca Ridge – Divergent plate boundary off the coast of the Pacific Northwest region of North America
- South American–Antarctic Ridge – Mid-ocean ridge in the South Atlantic
- Chile Rise – Submarine oceanic ridge in the Pacific Ocean
- East Pacific Rise – Ridge on the floor of the Pacific Ocean
- Gakkel Ridge – Mid-oceanic ridge under the Arctic Ocean (Mid-Arctic Ridge)
- Pacific-Antarctic Ridge – Tectonic plate boundary in the South Pacific Ocean
- Central Indian Ridge – North-south-trending mid-ocean ridge in the western Indian Ocean
  - Carlsberg Ridge – Tectonic plate ridge
- Southeast Indian Ridge – Mid-ocean ridge in the southern Indian Ocean
- Southwest Indian Ridge – Mid-ocean ridge in the Indian and Atlantic Oceans
- Mid-Atlantic Ridge – Atlantic Ocean tectonic plate boundary
  - Kolbeinsey Ridge – Segment of the Mid-Atlantic Ridge north of Iceland in the Arctic Ocean
  - Mohns Ridge – Geographical region in the Atlantic basin
  - Knipovich – Russian zoologist Ridge (between Greenland and Spitsbergen)
  - Reykjanes Ridge – Atlantic Ocean tectonic plate boundary (south of Iceland)

=== List of ancient oceanic ridges ===
- Aegir Ridge – Extinct mid-ocean ridge in the far-northern Atlantic Ocean
- Alpha Ridge – Major volcanic ridge under the Arctic Ocean
- Galápagos Rise – Fossil divergent boundary
- Kula-Farallon Ridge – Ancient mid-ocean ridge
- Mid-Labrador Ridge – Mid-ocean ridge in the Labrador Sea
- Pacific-Farallon Ridge – Spreading ridge during the Late Cretaceous
- Pacific-Kula Ridge – Former mid-ocean ridge
- Phoenix Ridge – Ancient mid-ocean ridge between the Phoenix and Pacific plates

== See also ==
- Afar Triangle – Geological depression caused by the Afar triple junction
- Aseismic ridge – Geologic feature below some oceans
- Geography of Iceland
- List of oceanic landforms
- Ocean chemistry
- Oceanic crust
- Petrological Database of the Ocean Floor
- Project FAMOUS – first crewed submersible study of the rift valley of the Mid-Atlantic Ridge
- RISE project – discovery of black smokers hydrothermal systems on the East Pacific Rise
- Slab window – Type of gap in a subducted oceanic plate
- Submarine volcano – Underwater vents or fissures in the Earth's surface from which magma can erupt
- Vine-Matthews-Morely hypothesis; explains relation of marine magnetic anomalies to seafloor spreading.
