= Treasure of Lima: A Buried Exhibition =

Treasure of Lima: A Buried Exhibition was an art project curated by Nadim Samman for the Thyssen-Bornemisza Art Contemporary Academy, which took place on Isla del Coco (Cocos Island), a remote, protected island in the Pacific Ocean off the coast of Costa Rica. Works by forty artists were placed inside a chest and buried in a secret location on the island, the pirate history of which inspired Robert Louis Stevenson’s novel Treasure Island.

== Background ==
Isla del Coco is the historical source of many legends relating to buried treasure. The best-known is that of the Treasure of Lima. In 1820, with the army of José de San Martín approaching Lima, Viceroy José de la Serna entrusted the treasures of the city to British trader Captain William Thompson for safekeeping, until the Spaniards could secure the country. Instead of waiting in the harbour as they were instructed, Thompson and his crew killed the Viceroy’s men and sailed to Isla del Coco, where they buried the treasure. Shortly afterwards, they were apprehended by a Spanish warship. Thompson and his first mate said they would show the Spaniards where they had hidden the treasure, in return for their lives. However, after landing on the island they escaped into the forest. A large number of attempts have been made to find the treasure, but none has succeeded.

== The project ==
The art project consisted of a vacuum-sealed container containing artworks by forty artists, buried at a secret location. The contents of the container included works on paper, sculpture, vinyl LPs, digital video and audio files. The container was a truncated tetrahedron made of stainless steel that opened to reveal a second spherical container made of glass. Within that vacuum-sealed sphere were a series of aluminium boxes housing the artworks.

Artists represented in the project included Marina Abramović, Doug Aitken, Darren Almond, Angela Bulloch, Los Carpinteros, Phil Collins, Constant Dullaart, Olafur Eliasson, Carl Michael von Hausswolff, Pierre Huyghe, Sharon Lockhart, Carsten Nicolai, Raymond Pettibon, Lari Pittman, Jon Rafman, Matthew Ritchie, Ed Ruscha, Chicks on Speed, Ryan Trecartin, Chris Watson, and Lawrence Weiner.

The container was buried on Cocos Island in May 2014, by an expedition led by art collector and patron Francesca von Habsburg.

The GPS coordinates of the exhibition location were given to the Dutch artist Constant Dullaart, who worked with a cryptographer to encode them. The resulting string of code was then engraved on a steel cylinder and encased within a replica of the treasure chest, which was sold at an auction in November 2014. The proceeds from the auction were donated to the marine protection of Cocos Island.
