= Galápagos Rise =

Fossil divergent boundary

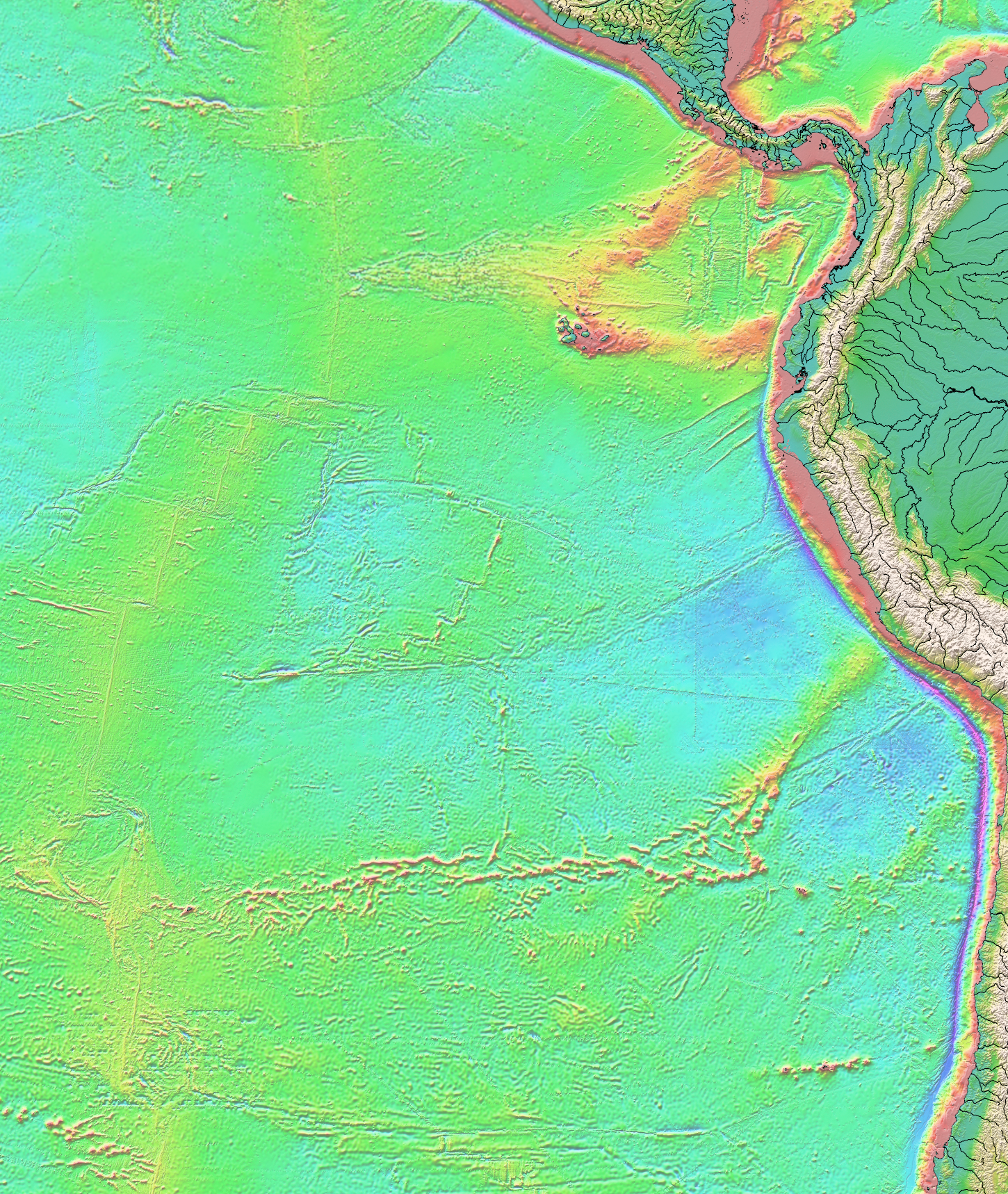
Map showing bathymetric features near Galápagos Rise.

The Galápagos Rise is an extinct spreading centre located about 1,000 km (620 mi; 540 nmi) southsouthwest of the Galápagos islands, and 2,000 km (1,200 mi; 1,100 nmi) west of Peru which was active in the Miocene period. It developed shortly after the Farallon plate broke into two parts, forming the Cocos and Nazca plates. During its existence as a spreading centre the Galápagos Rise formed the eastern boundary of the Bauer microplate.

== Geography ==
=== Extent ===
The rise is made up of a series of inactive ridge and transform segments, currently within the northwestern part of the Nazca plate, between about 8° and 17° South latitude. The northern end of the rise is delineated by two fracture zones, the North and South Gallego fracture zones. The southern end of the rise approaches close to the South Marquesas/Mendana fracture zone.

=== Features ===
The northern part of the ridge between 9.4° and 11.2° South is orientated north–south and contains in its most northerly portion a rift that descends to depths of 4,700 m (15,400 ft), which is a feature suggestive of previous slow spreading. Beyond 10.2° South is a ridge that reaches within 500 m (1,600 ft) of the sea surface and is associated with multiple volcanic cones which must have erupted after spreading had ceased.

The southern part of the ridge intersects the Huascar scarp, a feature that continues to the west of the Mendana fracture zone, which in turn continues to the west of the intersection as the Woce Ridge. The Woce Ridge is a 400 km (250 mi) long feature, almost orientated east–west and about 30 km (19 mi) wide, that is related to the southern boundary of the historic Bauer microplate.

== Geology ==
Samples recovered have been usually sparsely vesicular basalts with plagioclase characteristics, sometimes with clinopyroxene or olivine additional characteristics. The axial ridge and its flank basalts are mainly aphyric or sparsely plagioclase phyric.

=== Tectonic development ===
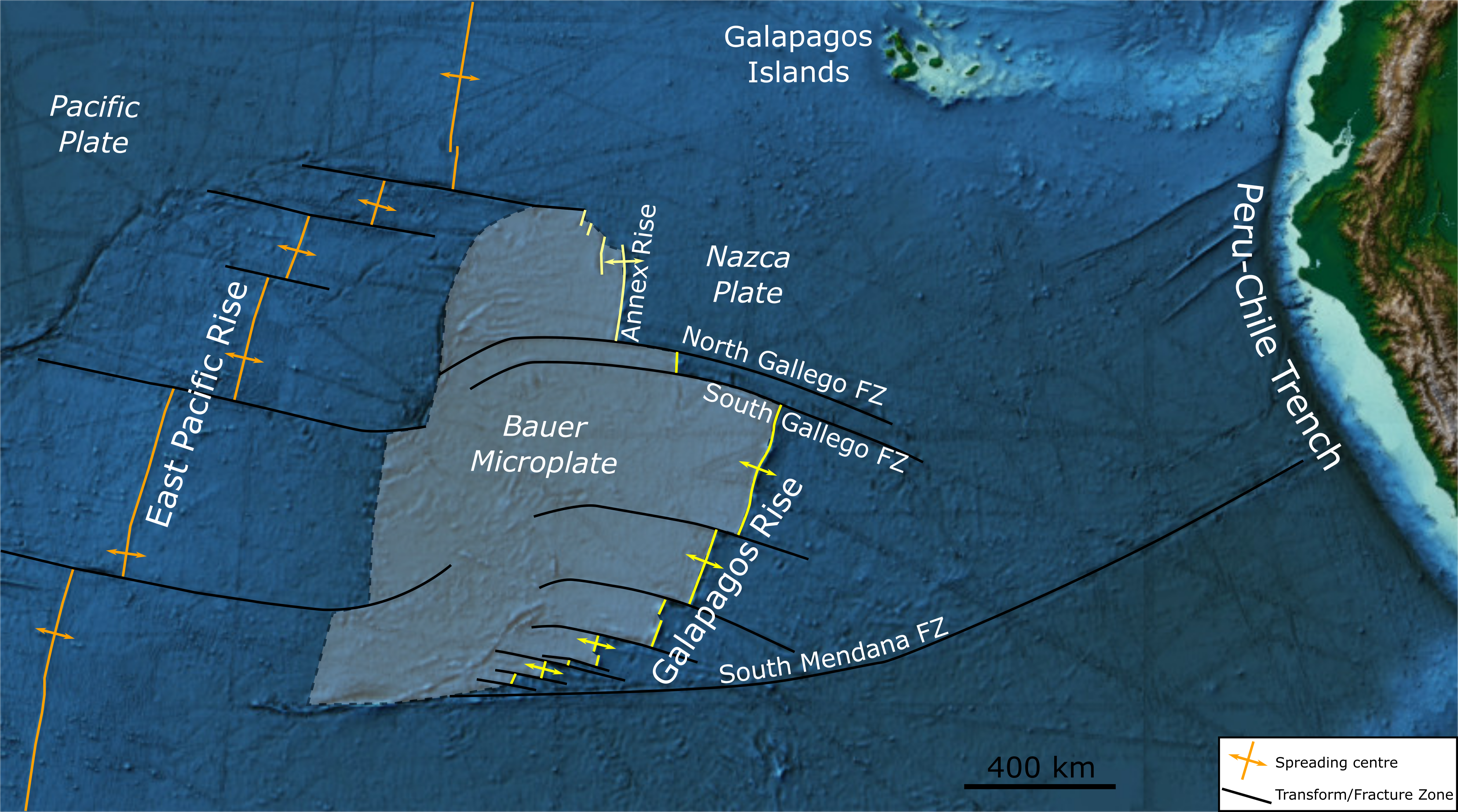
Map of tectonic features of the Galápagos Rise and the historic Bauer microplate

Towards the end of the Oligocene period, the large Farallon plate, which had long been subducting beneath the western margins of the North American plate, the Caribbean plate and the South American plate, began to break up, forming the Cocos and Nazca plates, which are separated by the Cocos–Nazca spreading centre well to the north of the ridge. Following this plate reorganisation, spreading along the East Pacific Rise was disrupted due to a 20° rotation in the spreading direction, causing locally chaotic spreading and the formation of large offset right-stepping transform faults.The existing 700 km (430 mi) long Marquesas/Mendana transform zone was incorporated into this new pattern. New spreading centres were formed from elements of this transform zone, a new part of the East Pacific Rise propagating to the north and a new rise, the Galápagos Rise, propagating to the south. Eventually these two ridges isolated a piece of older oceanic lithosphere, forming the Bauer microplate by between 18.5 and 18 Ma (chron 5D and 5E), that began to rotate anti-clockwise. In its southward propagation, the Galápagos Rise appears to have been unable to cross the South Marquesas/Mendana fracture zone, possibly because the oceanic lithosphere to the south was older and stronger.

The initiation of the spreading between the Nazca Plate and the Bauer microplate to its west, was about 18.5 Ma ago and has been estimated to have had a spreading rate of on average 170 mm (6.7 in)/year. At about 8 Ma, the western boundary of the microplate moved west with part of the Pacific plate becoming annexed to the microplate. This change also added another area to the microplate to the north, bounded to the east by the Annexe Rise. The Galápagos Rise spreading slowed at about 6.5 Ma ago when expansion transferred progressively to the East Pacific Rise, 900 km (560 mi; 490 nmi) to the west of the Galápagos Rise, until it ceased completely at 5.8 Ma. The result of this process was that the Bauer microplate was effectively captured by the Nazca plate.

After spreading ceased along the Galápagos Rise, there is evidence that magmatism continued along parts of the rise for at least a further 2 Ma. These post-spreading lavas are more alkali-rich than those extruded before spreading stopped.

== History ==
The presence of a shallow rise between the East Pacific Raise and South America was suspected from studies reported in 1956 by Maurice Ewing and Bruce C. Heezen. It was named the Galápagos Rise in 1964, and further studies from 1972 onward suggested it was associated with a fossil spreading centre.
