= Galápagos spreading centre =

Western part of the Cocos–Nazca spreading centre

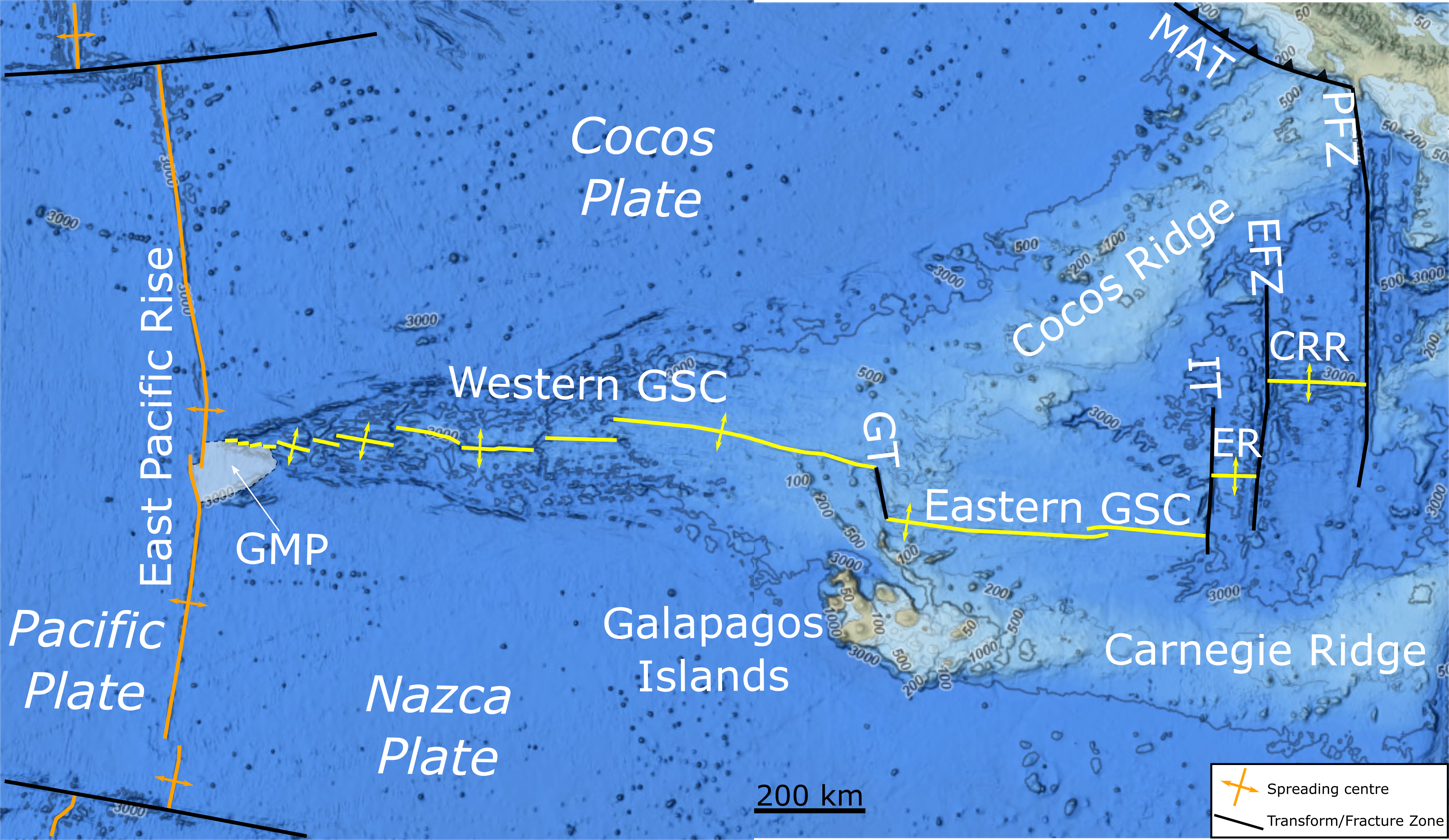
Map of the Cocos–Nazca spreading centre. Abbreviations used: GMP Galápagos microplate, GSC Galápagos spreading centre, GT Galápagos transform, IT Inca transform, EFZ Ecuador fracture zone, PFZ Panama fracture zone, MAT Middle America Trench, ER Ecuador Rise, CRR Costa Rica Rise

In plate tectonics, the Galápagos spreading centre, Galápagos spreading center or Cocos–Nazca rift is a divergent boundary that forms the western part of the Cocos–Nazca spreading centre between the Cocos and Nazca plates. It extends for over 1800 km (1100 miles) from close to the eastern boundary of the Pacific plate, the East Pacific Rise, in the west, to the Inca transform in the east. It consists of two main ridge segments linked by the Galápagos transform.

== Geometry ==
The Galápagos spreading centre (GSC) consists of two main sections, linked by the Galápagos transform. The western section extends from the propagating tip of the GSC (about 30 km (19 mi) east of the East Pacific Rise) for about 1,200 km (750 mi) to the northern end of the transform. On the basis of changes in character along its length, this section has been divided into three "provinces". The western province, which runs with a trend of N092°E from the western tip to about 95.5° W, is characterised by multiple short segments with mainly left-stepping offsets between them, but with overlaps and no transforms. In this part of the GSC there is a well-developed axial valley. The middle province from 95.5° W to about 93.2° W shows a transition towards a central ridge development, a small rotation of the axis to N096°E and many small left-stepping offsets. The eastern province runs from 93.2° W to 91.0° W, showing small right-stepping offsets, a further rotation to N100°E and a fully developed central ridge. The western end of the GSC forms part of the boundary to the clockwise-rotating Galápagos microplate.

The eastern section runs for about 600 km (370 mi) from the southern end of the Galápagos transform to the Inca transform with a constant trend of N097°E. There are two main segments that overlap with a left-stepping offset with no transform developed at 87° W. To the west of this overlap, the GSC is divided into a further six segments. The easternmost three segments are characterised by multiple alternating low-relief valleys and ridges. The westernmost segments all have an axial valley within a single ridge.

The ~95 km (59 mi) long Galápagos transform links the two main sections of the GSC. It is somewhat oblique to the direction of spreading in the two segments that it links, suggesting that it is unlikely to be a true transform. It is thought to have formed as a result of one or more southward jumps of the eastern GSC towards the Galápagos hotspot.

== Galápagos microplate ==
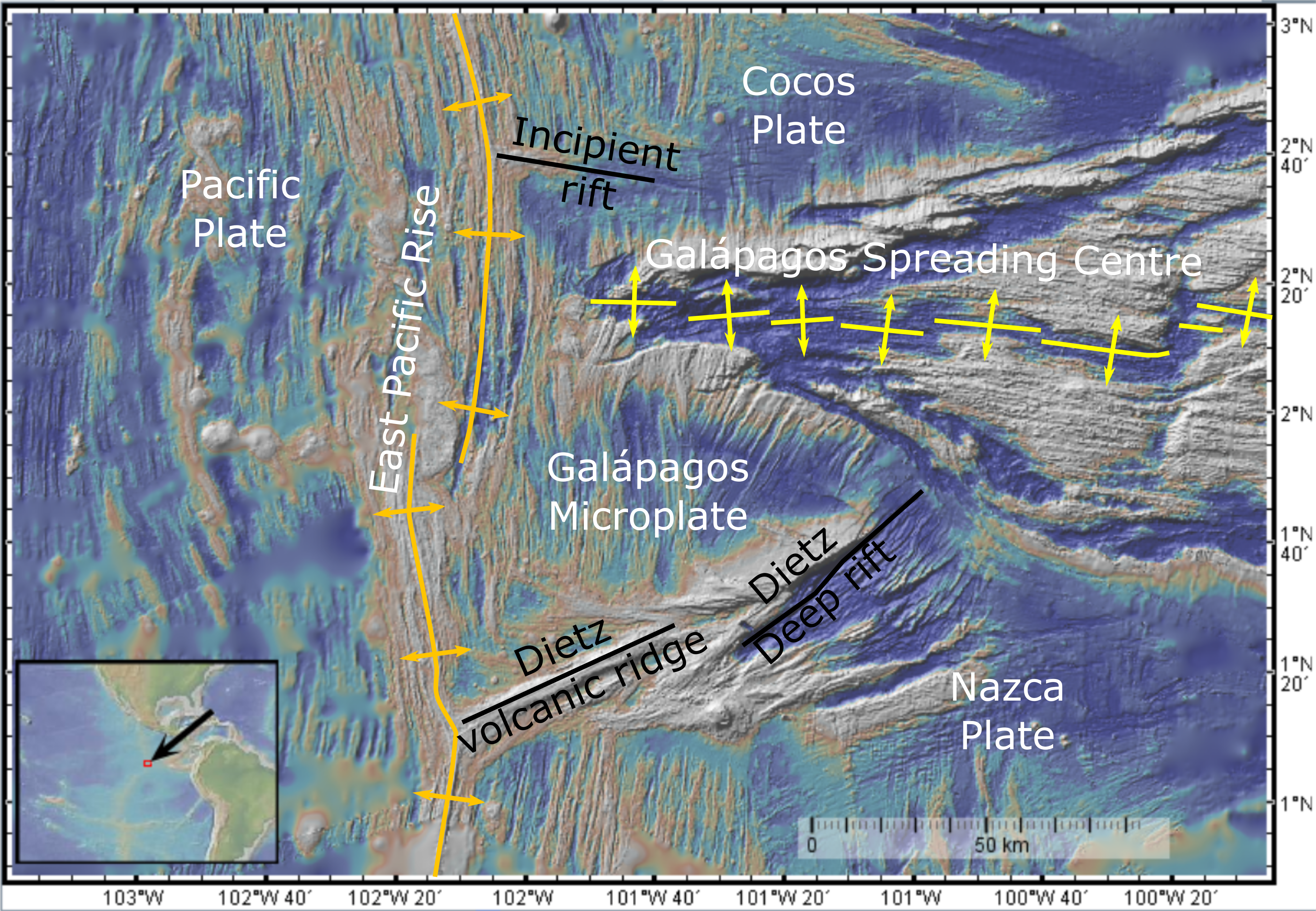
Bathymetric map of area around the Galápagos microplate with main tectonic features marked

The 13,000 km^{2} (5,000 sq mi) Galápagos microplate lies at the western end of the GSC. It is bounded to the west by strands of the East Pacific Rise, to the southeast by the Dietz Volcanic Ridge and the Dietz Deep rift, and to the north by the GSC. Another separate, smaller microplate has also been proposed, bounded to the north by an incipient rift structure. The main (southern) microplate rotates clockwise, while the northern microplate rotates anticlockwise.

The westward propagation of the GSC has apparently stalled, getting no closer to the East Pacific Rise during the last few million years, due to interactions with the microplate.

== Galápagos hotspot ==
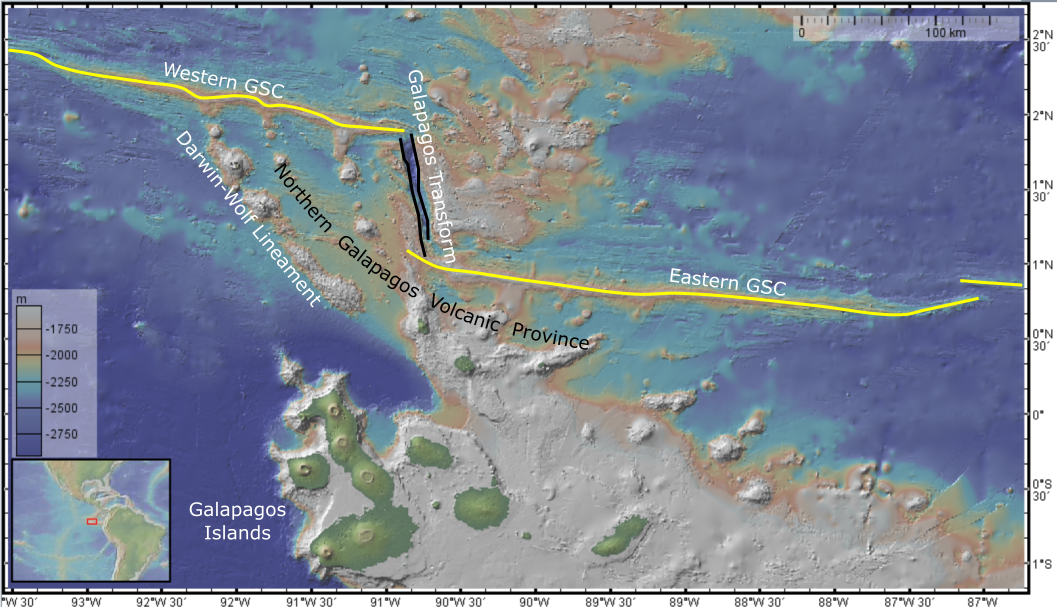
Bathymetric map of the Northern Galápagos Volcanic Province

The Galápagos hotspot has been sited close to the GSC since the break-up of the Farallon plate as demonstrated by the Cocos and Carnegie aseismic ridges. More recently the hotspot has been located to the south of the GSC resulting in an overall relative northward movement of the GSC. However, the eastern section of the GSC shows evidence of repeated ridge jumps, with the active spreading location moving episodically to the south, towards the hotspot, creating the Galápagos transform.

Between the Galápagos Islands and the GSC, a large group of volcanic seamounts are developed, known as the Northern Galápagos Volcanic Province (NGVP). The seamounts are sited along a series of ridges that fan out from just north of the islands, terminating at the GSC. The most prominent and westerly of these is the Wolf–Darwin lineament, on which both Wolf Island and Darwin Island are located. The ridges are interpreted to represent the surface expression of channels along which magma is moving from the hotspot to the GSC.
