= Cyperus nudiceps =

Scientific classification
- Kingdom: Plantae
- Clade: Tracheophytes
- Clade: Angiosperms
- Clade: Monocots
- Clade: Commelinids
- Order: Poales
- Family: Cyperaceae
- Genus: Cyperus
- Species: C. nudiceps

Binomial name
- Cyperus nudiceps (C.B.Clarke ex Standl.) O'Neill

Species of plant

Cyperus nudiceps is a species of flowering plant in the family Cyperaceae, only found on Cocos Island. It was first described as Kyllinga nudiceps in 1929 and transferred to Cyperus in 1944.

== See also ==
- List of Cyperus species
