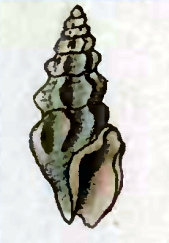
- Drawing of a shell of Drillia sinuosa

Scientific classification
- Kingdom: Animalia
- Phylum: Mollusca
- Class: Gastropoda
- Subclass: Caenogastropoda
- Order: Neogastropoda
- Superfamily: Conoidea
- Family: Drilliidae
- Genus: Drillia
- Species: D. sinuosa

Binomial name
- Drillia sinuosa (Montagu, 1803)

Synonyms
- Clavus amanda Smith, E.A., 1882; Drillia amanda E.A. Smith, 1882; Pleurotoma (Clavus) amanda E. Smith, 1882; Pleurotoma sinuosa (Montagu, G., 1803); Turris (Inquisitor) amanda E. Smith, 1882

= Drillia sinuosa =

Species of gastropod

Drillia sinuosa is a species of sea snail, a marine gastropod mollusk in the family Drilliidae.

Drillia sinuosa McLean, J.H. & R. Poorman, 1971 is a junior homonym and is a synonym of Drillia macleani Tucker, J.K., 1992

== Description ==
The length of the shell attains 18 mm.

The solid shell has a turreted shape, with a few prominent longitudinal ribs terminating at the periphery, crossed by close, strong striae. The aperture is broadly cut out below, with no proper siphonal canal. The large anal sinus is ascending. The color of the shell is white, or brownish with white ribs, or whitish indistinctly maculated or centrally banded with light brown.

== Distribution ==
This species occurs in the Atlantic Ocean off St. Helena.
