= August Gissler =

August Gissler (9 September 1857 in Remscheid – 8 August 1935 in New York City) was a German adventurer and treasure hunter who, with brief interruptions, lived on Cocos Island (Costa Rica) from 1889 until 1908.

Gissler's aim was to find the Golden Madonna of the Treasure of Lima, a solid-gold, gem-encrusted, life-sized image of the Virgin Mary, allegedly buried there by the mutineer Captain William Thompson in 1820. Over the years, Gissler dug a complex system of tunnels, some of which can still be entered today. Gissler was certain that he would find the treasure, because he had two maps from independent sources that identified the same place, where the treasure was supposed to be buried. At the same time, Gissler was looking for the treasure also allegedly buried on the island by the pirate Benito Bonito.

Impressed with his organization, the Costa Rican government allowed Gissler to establish a colony of several German farmers in 1897, and named him the first (and, up to now, only) Governor of Cocos Island. The treasure hunt was mainly funded by financiers who had invested in the specially created Cocos Plantation Company. Several settler families, who grew tobacco, also lived with Gissler on the island. However, because of the island's harsh conditions and remote location from the Costa Rican mainland, Gissler's colony turned out to be short-lived. During the following ten years all the settler families moved away. Gissler and his wife were the last to abandon the island.

Gissler's quest for treasure was also unsuccessful. In over twenty years, despite diligent searching, he never found more than six gold coins. Dispirited, he left the island for New York in 1908. Of over 300 treasure expeditions to Cocos Island over the years, none are known to have found any treasure.

== Sources ==
- De Montmorency, Hervey Guy Francis Edward, 1868-1942. On the track of a treasure : the story of an adventurous expedition to the Pacific island of Cocos in search of treasure of untold value hidden by pirates, London : Hurst and Blackett, 1904. Chapter XIV—A monarch of all he surveys : p 230-246
- PBS Online - Nova Legends and Lore.
- Reagen Smith - A history of buried treasure on Coco's Island.
