= Island of the Sharks =

- Directed by: Howard Hall
- Written by: Thomas Friedman; Howard Hall
- Produced by: Michele Binder Hall
- Narrated by: Linda Hunt
- Cinematography: Bob Cranston; Howard Hall
- Edited by: Mark Fletcher
- Music by: Alan Williams
- Production companies: Howard Hall Productions; NOVA/WGBH Boston
- Distributed by: IMAX
- Release date: April 30, 1999
- Country: United States
- Language: English
- Box office: $10.6 million

Island of the Sharks is a 1999 IMAX film, produced by Michele Hall and directed by Howard Hall, documenting life under the surface around Cocos Island. The film has a 40-minute runtime. The island is a nexus for marine animals of many kinds including many varieties of sharks, manta rays, marlin, dolphins, whales, and sea turtles. The film depicts the whitetip reef shark, the hammerhead shark, the blacktip shark, and the silky shark, among others. The movie's music was composed by Alan Williams. The film was narrated by Linda Hunt.
