= Treasure of Lima =

Supposed treasure buried 1820, Peru

The Treasure of Lima is a legendary buried treasure reputedly removed from Lima, Peru, in 1820 and never recovered. It is estimated to be worth up to £160 million or $208 million in today's money.

== History ==
Spain had controlled Lima since the 16th century, when it defeated the Incas. In the centuries that followed, the Roman Catholic Church gathered a huge treasure in Lima. In the early 19th century, Spain began to have difficulties with its colonies due to wars of independence in South America. Lima was no exception, and in 1820 the city came under heavy pressure and finally had to be evacuated. (See also Peruvian War of Independence.)

In 1820, Lima was on the edge of revolt. As a preventative measure, the Viceroy of Lima decided to transport the city's fabulous wealth to Mexico for safekeeping. The treasures included jeweled stones, candlesticks, and two life-size solid gold statues of Mary holding the baby Jesus. In all, the treasure was valued at between $12 million and $60 million.

Captain William Thompson, commander of the Mary Dear, was put in charge of transporting the riches to Mexico. Thompson and his crew proved to be unable to resist the temptation; they turned pirate, cut the throats of the guards and accompanying priests, and threw their bodies overboard.

Thompson headed for Cocos Island, off the coast of present-day Costa Rica, where he and his men allegedly buried the treasure. They then decided to split up and lie low until the situation had calmed down, at which time they would reconvene to divvy up the spoils.

However, the Mary Dear was captured, and the crew went on trial for piracy. All but Thompson and his first mate James Alexander Forbes were hanged. To save their lives, the two agreed to lead the Spanish to the stolen treasure. They took them as far as the Cocos Islands and then managed to escape into the jungle. Thompson, the first mate, and the treasure were never seen again, though it is believed that Thompson returned to Newfoundland with the aid of a whaling ship. Forbes settled in California and became a successful businessman, but never returned to the island.

== Treasure hunting ==
Since that time, hundreds of treasure hunters have travelled to Cocos Island and tried to find the Treasure of Lima, sometimes also referred to as the Loot of Lima, or the Cocos Island Treasure. One of the most notable was the German August Gissler, who lived on the island from 1889 to 1908. Another was the American gangster Bugsy Siegel and yet another was New Zealand explorer Frank Worsley. None succeeded in finding the treasure. One theory is that the treasure was not buried on the Cocos Islands at all, but on an unknown island off the coast of Central America. The Costa Rican government does not allow treasure hunting any longer and believes no treasure exists on this island.

Underscoring this legend are several facts:

1. In 1855 a New York newspaper printed an 1854 letter from San Francisco, California, which recounted that there was a treasure expedition going to Cocos Island based on a near deathbed confession - only the treasure did not come from Lima but was alleged to be from a Spanish galleon that had been captured in 1816 by pirates and buried on Cocos Island
2. August Gissler, who lived on Cocos Island from 1889 to 1908; his quest for treasure was also unsuccessful: in over twenty years he never found more than six gold coins despite diligent searching
3. By 1929 the version of the so-called Cathedral of Lima/Treasure of Lima was printed in an American newspaper
4. Another version of the Lost Treasure of Lima claims it was buried in Tuamotu archipelago, part of the French Polynesia. From a 1939 book "The Treasure of the Tuamotus"

== Treasure of Lima: A Buried Exhibition ==
An art project called Treasure of Lima: A Buried Exhibition took place on Cocos Island in May 2014. A container with artwork by 40 different artists was buried in a secret location, with the coordinates auctioned off.

== See also ==
- List of missing treasures
