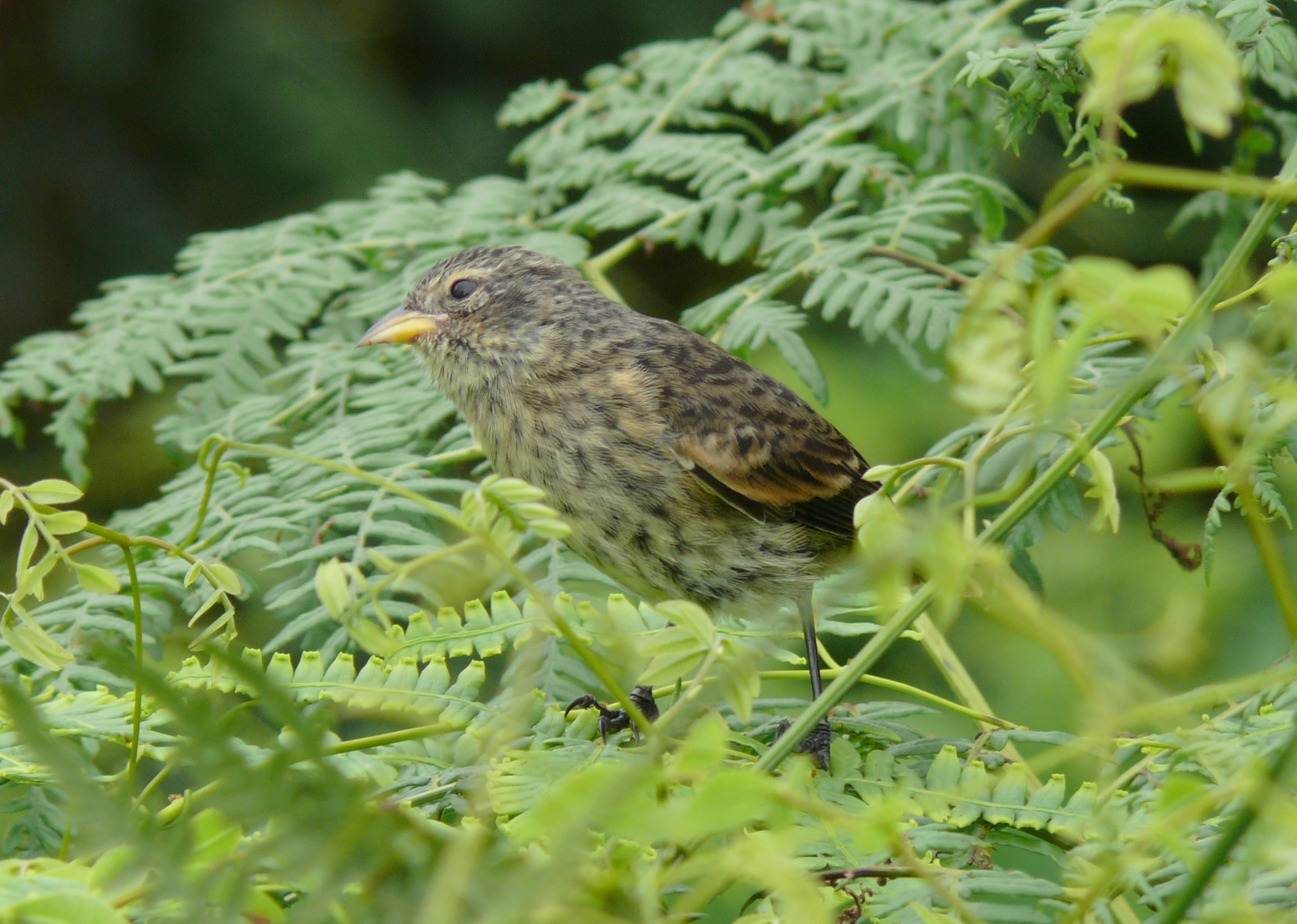
- Cocos finch, female
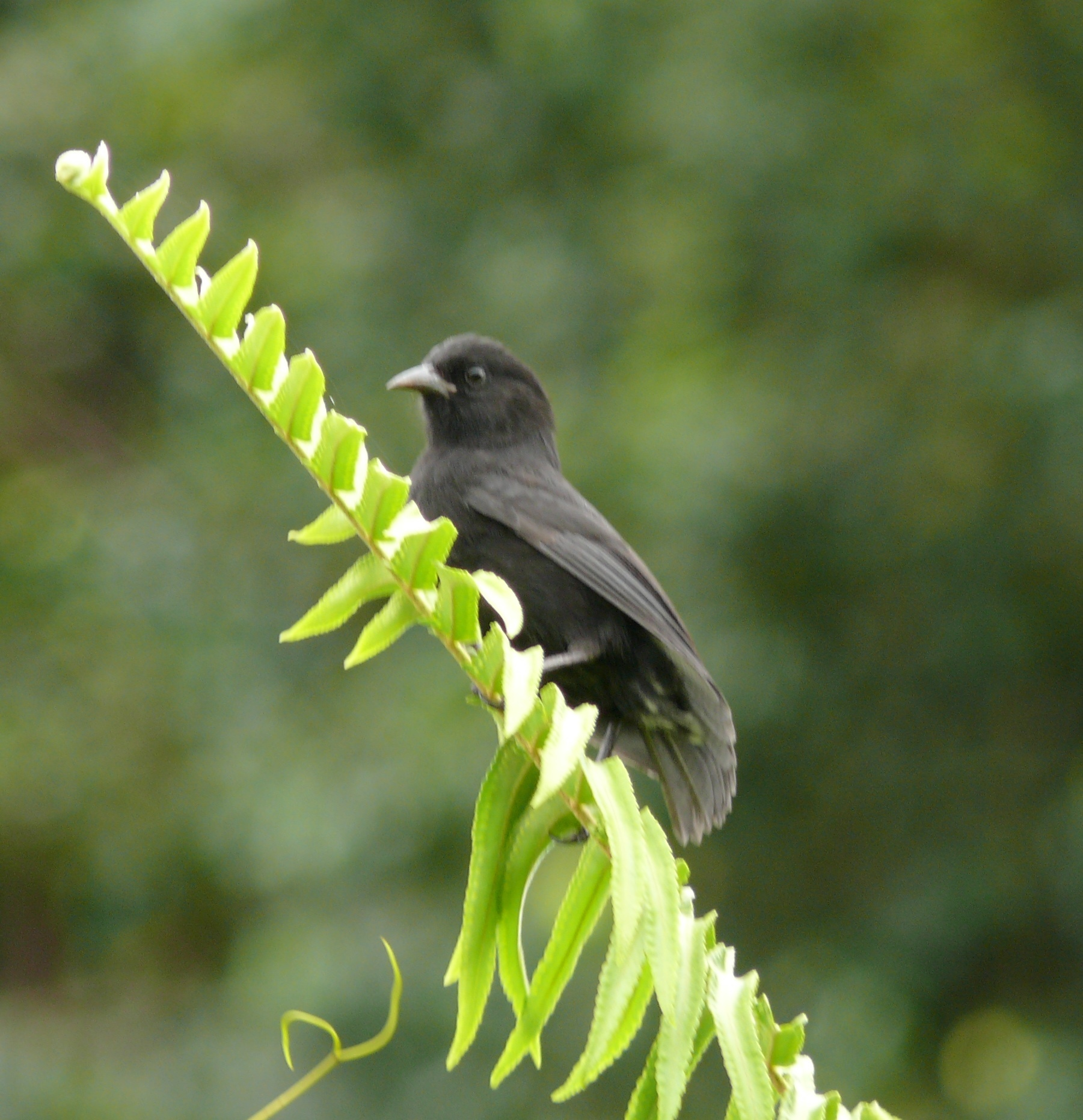
- Cocos finch, male

Conservation status
- Least Concern (IUCN 3.1)

Scientific classification
- Kingdom: Animalia
- Phylum: Chordata
- Class: Aves
- Order: Passeriformes
- Family: Thraupidae
- Genus: Pinaroloxias; Sharpe, 1885
- Species: P. inornata

Binomial name
- Pinaroloxias inornata (Gould, 1843)

= Cocos finch =

Species of bird

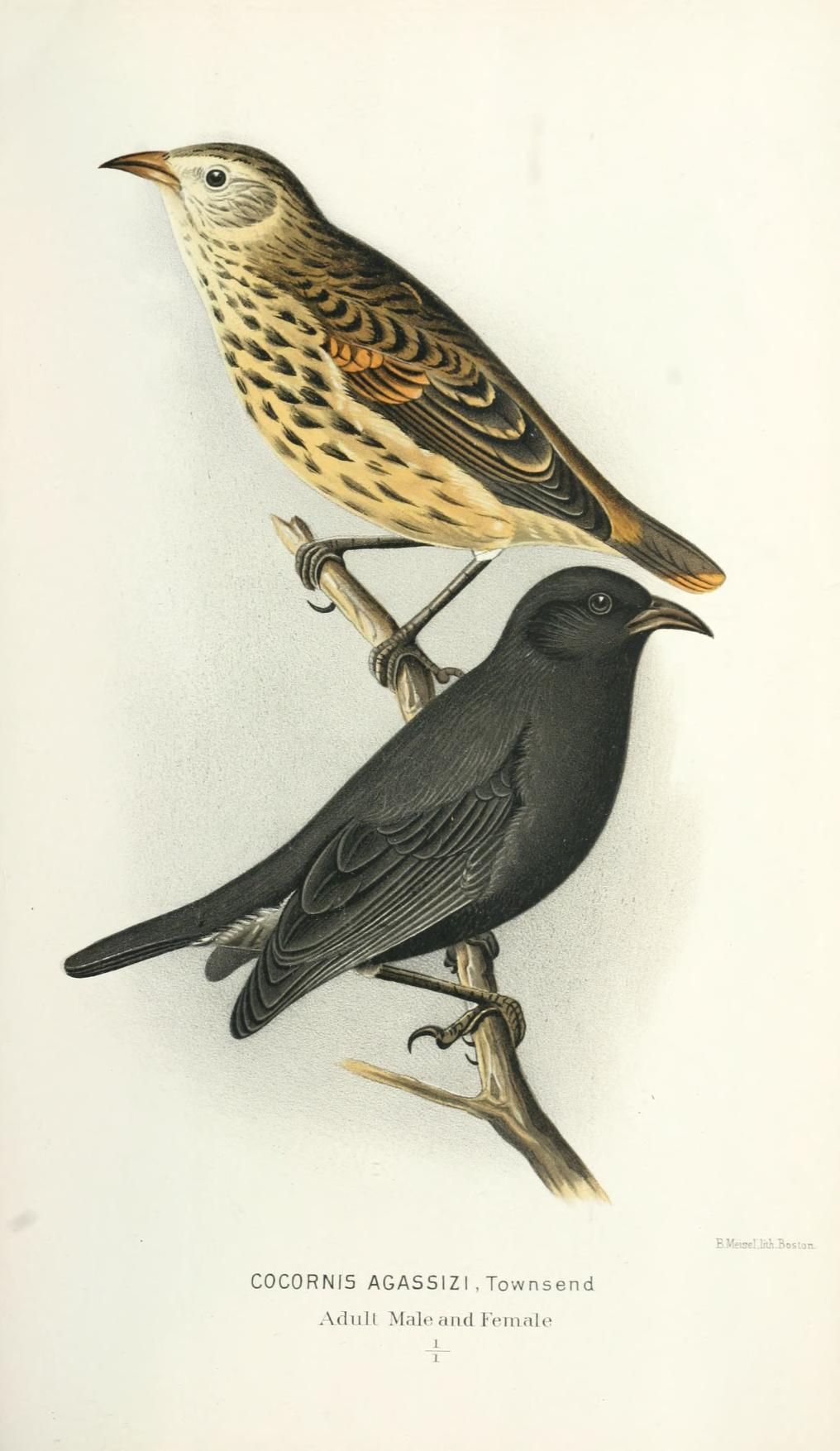

The Cocos finch (Pinaroloxias inornata) or Cocos Island finch, is the only one of Darwin's finches not native to the Galápagos Islands, and the only member of the genus Pinaroloxias. Sometimes classified in the family Emberizidae, more recent studies have shown it to belong in the tanager family, Thraupidae. It is endemic to Cocos Island, a Pacific island which is approximately 360 miles (580 km) south of Costa Rica.

== Taxonomy ==
The Cocos finch was formally described in 1843 by the English ornithologist John Gould under the binomial name Cactornis inornatus. The species was moved to a new genus Pinaroloxias by Richard Bowdler Sharpe in 1885. The genus name combines the Ancient Greek pinaros meaning "dirty" or "squalid" with Loxia, a genus introduced by Carl Linnaeus in 1758 for the crossbills. The specific epithet inornata is Latin for "plain" or "unadorned". The Cocos finch is a member of a group collectively known as Darwin's finches. Although traditionally placed with the buntings and New World sparrows in the family Emberizidae, molecular phylogenetic studies have shown that Darwin's finches are members of the subfamily Coerebinae within the tanager family Thraupidae. The Cocos finch was first categorized to be closer to the warbler finch clade due to the similar morphology of cousin warbler finches.

The Cocos finch shares many morphological similarities to other Darwin's finches despite having been separated from the Galapagos Islands. What is unique, however, of the Cocos finch is that they display an intra-species variation in feeding habits. The variation in foraging behaviors are hypothesized to be possible by observational learning from other Cocos finches. These feeding specializations are independent of any morphological changes, sex and age differences, rather, they are derived from an intra-species variation found within the Cocos finch. Still, despite its variation in feeding patterns, Cocos finches are categorized as one species with no known subspecies.

== Description ==
The Cocos finch is about 12 cm (4.7 in) long and weighs about 12.5 g (0.44 oz). The bird has a black decurved pointed bill for eating berries and insects that are its main diet. They are sexually dimorphic in that the males are almost entirely black, having black feathers from the tail, breast, nape, and crown. Unlike male finches found on the Galapágos islands, male Cocos finches have black beaks year-round, never changing color.

Female Cocos finches have a lighter brown complexion compared to males. There is a black splattering of feathers on their breast area down to the flank and rump. The belly of the female Cocos finch is milky white compared to the mantle of the bird. The nape and crown area are more noticeably black. The young are similar, but have yellow bills.

The call of a Cocos finch can be described as a "buzzy" like sound with a high-pitched ending note. The beginning of the call can form a "djirr" sound followed by a high pitched "tiew" sound. Calls can also include a high pitched "phzzzz" sound.

== Distribution and habitat ==
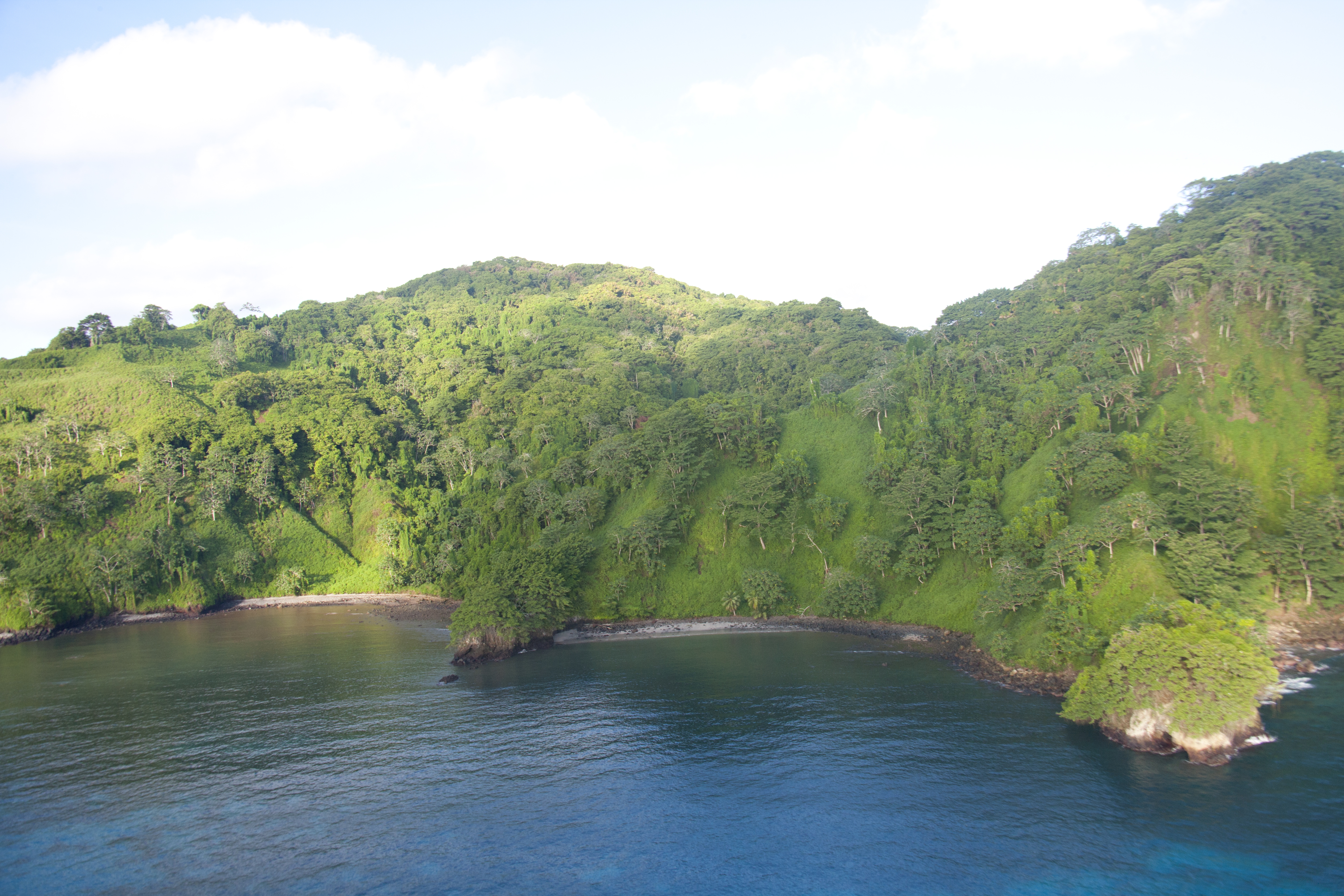
Cocos Island viewed from a helicopter

The Cocos finch is exclusively found in Cocos Island (which takes up a 1,997 km^{2} area), 580 km southeast from Costa Rica. Cocos finches are not known to have traveled outside of Cocos Island, making its habitat and reproduction range to only be 30 km^{2} (12 sq mi) of the entire island. The habitat of the Cocos finch is mostly within hibiscus thickets, closed-canopy forest, and woodland forest.

The climate within Cocos Island is described to be a typical rainforest climate with high humidity and chances for rainfall. The island has a varied landscape with bodies of lakes, streams, and caves and is home to other species including endemic lizards (only two species) and some migratory birds.

== Ecology and behavior ==
=== Foraging patterns ===
Cocos finches are known to be a generalist species, although they are also known to specialize in an individual level which can result in different foraging behaviors within individual Cocos finches. This specialized behavior of Cocos finches can be explained through learning foraging patterns through other Cocos finches and can resonate said individual behavior to other Cocos Finches.

=== Breeding ===
Cocos finch usually nest throughout the year; however, their breeding season falls usually at around January–February. They form a nest using lichens and dry moss as their main material. The standard clutch is two brown-spotted white eggs, which are hatched in a roughly spherical nest built at the end of a tree branch. Eggs are in clutch sizes of about 4–5 with distinctive pink/light brown spots.

=== Threats ===
Cocos finches face invasive mammalian predators, like rats and cats, on the island. Despite these predators, there is no evidence of high predatory pressures on the Cocos finches themselves. Scientists conclude that due to the low predatory pressures on Cocos finches, they have developed this specialized feeding behavior to evolve to a more generalist species.

== Status ==
Cocos Island is a natural reserved island, such that there is limited human interaction with the Cocos finch and other Cocos Island wildlife. While there has been increasing tourism around the island, there is no evidence of high disturbance rates from these tourists to affect the wildlife in the island including the Cocos finch.

Despite having a small distribution, due to the predation and disturbance rate of Cocos finches being low, along with a steady population rate, the IUCN deems the Cocos finch to be Least Concern.

Currently, there are estimated to be about 6,000–15,000 Cocos finches on Cocos Island.
