= Drillia macleani =

Scientific classification
- Kingdom: Animalia
- Phylum: Mollusca
- Class: Gastropoda
- Subclass: Caenogastropoda
- Order: Neogastropoda
- Family: Drilliidae
- Genus: Drillia
- Species: D. macleani

Binomial name
- Drillia macleani Tucker J.K., 1992

Synonyms
- Pleurotoma sinuosa Mighels, J.W., 1845; Nomen novum pro Drillia sinuosa McLean & R. Poorman, 1971

Species of gastropod

Drillia macleani is a species of sea snail, a marine gastropod mollusk in the family Drilliidae. It is named after American malacologist, James Hamilton McLean.

== Description ==
The length of an adult shell varies between 10 mm and 17 mm.

== Distribution ==
This species is found in the demersal zone of the Pacific Ocean off Isla Santa Cruz, Galápagos Islands, and in the Caribbean Sea off Cocos Island, Costa Rica.
