= Cocos Ridge =

Aseismic ridge within the Cocos plate

Coordinates: 5.0°N 86.0°W

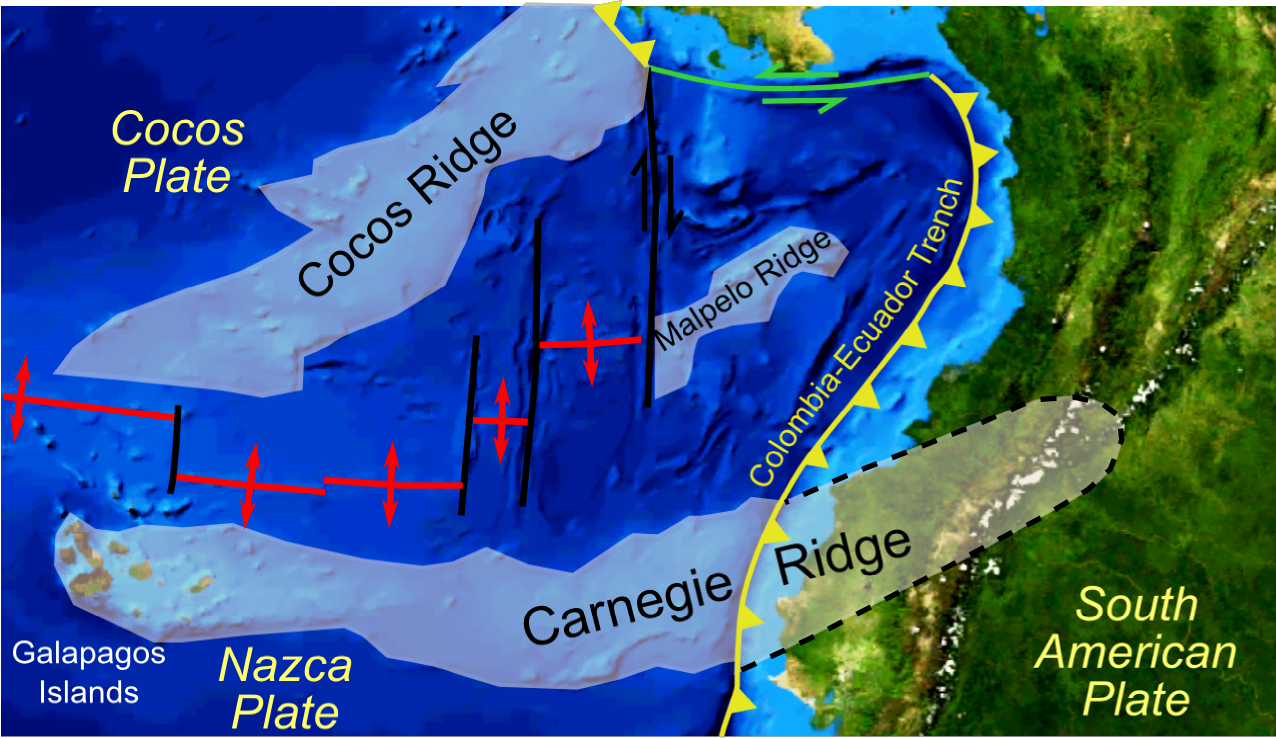
Outline of aseismic ridges and plate boundaries off northwestern South America

The Cocos Ridge is an aseismic ridge within the Cocos plate that runs northeastwards from just north of the Galápagos islands to the Middle America Trench offshore Panama. It records the effects of the Galápagos hotspot on the Cocos plate since the establishment of the Cocos–Nazca spreading centre during the break-up of the Farallon plate towards the end of the Oligocene epoch. It is the counterpart to the Carnegie Ridge, which developed on the Nazca plate.

Cocos Island is the only emergent part of the ridge. The volcanic activity that formed the island is much younger than the part of the ridge where it is located.

== Extent ==
The Cocos Ridge is a ~1000 km long bathymetric high, varying in width up to 200 km. It lies entirely within the Cocos plate. The presence of a shallow area between the Galápagos islands and Cocos Island was first identified by Alexander Agassiz in 1892, naming it the Galapagos Plateau. After the acquisition of more depth soundings it became clear that the shallow area continued almost up to the coast and it was given the name Cocos Ridge in 1950, for Cocos Island. The ridge is typically about 2–3000 m shallower than the nearby areas of the Cocos plate. On the northwestern flank of the ridge there is a broad area in which many seamounts are developed. Far fewer seamounts are found on the crest or the southeastern flank giving the ridge an overall asymmetric geometry. This asymmetry is also expressed in the chemistry of the lavas found, with the northwestern seamounts having an ocean island basalt composition, while lavas on the southeastern flank have compositions more typical of mid-ocean ridge basalts.

== Development ==
The ridge began to form immediately after the establishment of the Cocos–Nazca spreading centre in the late Oligocene. Initially (at about 23 Ma) the spreading centre is interpreted to have had a relatively simple SW–NE trend, with the hotspot lying just on its northwestern side, starting the formation of the Cocos Ridge. By 19.5 Ma, the spreading centre was now north of the hotspot and, during the next 5 million years, the spreading centre reorganised, with the spreading elements rotating clockwise, trending west-east. During this period the hotspot mainly lay to the south of the spreading centre on the Nazca plate, forming the broad part of the Carnegie Ridge that is now subducting beneath the South America plate. From 14.5 Ma to 12 Ma the spreading centre moved south so that the Nazca plate was less affected, causing narrowing of the Carnegie Ridge at this time. This was in contrast a major growth period for the Cocos Ridge. At this time the Malpelo Ridge began to rift away from the Carnegie Ridge. After 12 Ma the spreading centre began to move slowly northwards. At about 9.5 Ma, spreading ceased between the Malpelo and Carnegie ridges. At about 3.5 Ma a new spreading centre developed briefly on the northwestern edge of the Cocos Ridge. This rift failed by about 2.6 Ma and alkalic vulcanism associated with this formed Cocos Island and the Cocos seamount province. The spreading centre continued its overall northward motion, but to the east of the hotspot the spreading centre repeatedly jumped southwards towards the hotspot, leading to the formation of the Galápagos transform. Following the formation of the transform the Northern Galápagos Volcanic Province developed between the Galápagos islands and the spreading centre.

== Structure ==
The Cocos Ridge consists of thickened oceanic crust. Geophysical investigations using seismic reflection and wide-angle techniques have been used to determine the internal structure of the ridge. Observations on the oldest part of the ridge offshore Costa Rica show variations in thickness of the various layers both parallel to the ridge axis and parallel to the Middle America Trench. The ridge's crustal thickness is at least twice as large as the surrounding crust of the Cocos plate. Typical oceanic crust has three main layers: layer 1, which consists of sediments; layer 2, typically 2 km thick, which consists of extrusive and intrusive basaltic material; layer 3, typically about 6 km thick, which is thought to have a gabbroic composition. Over most of the area surveyed, the ridge is characterised by an additional 2 km of extrusive basalts above the normal 2 km thick layer 2. Locally, beneath the Quepos plateau, this additional layer reaches 3 km in thickness. On the flanks of the ridge the lower crustal layer 3 is about 6 km thick, similar to average oceanic crust. However, in the central part of the ridge this more than doubles, reaching a maximum of 17 km in some parts. The additional thickness is also thought to be gabbroic in type from the observed seismic velocities. All the extra thickness observed in layers 2 and 3 is thought to be a result of past proximity to the Galápagos hotspot.
