= Panama fracture zone =

Right lateral-moving transform fault

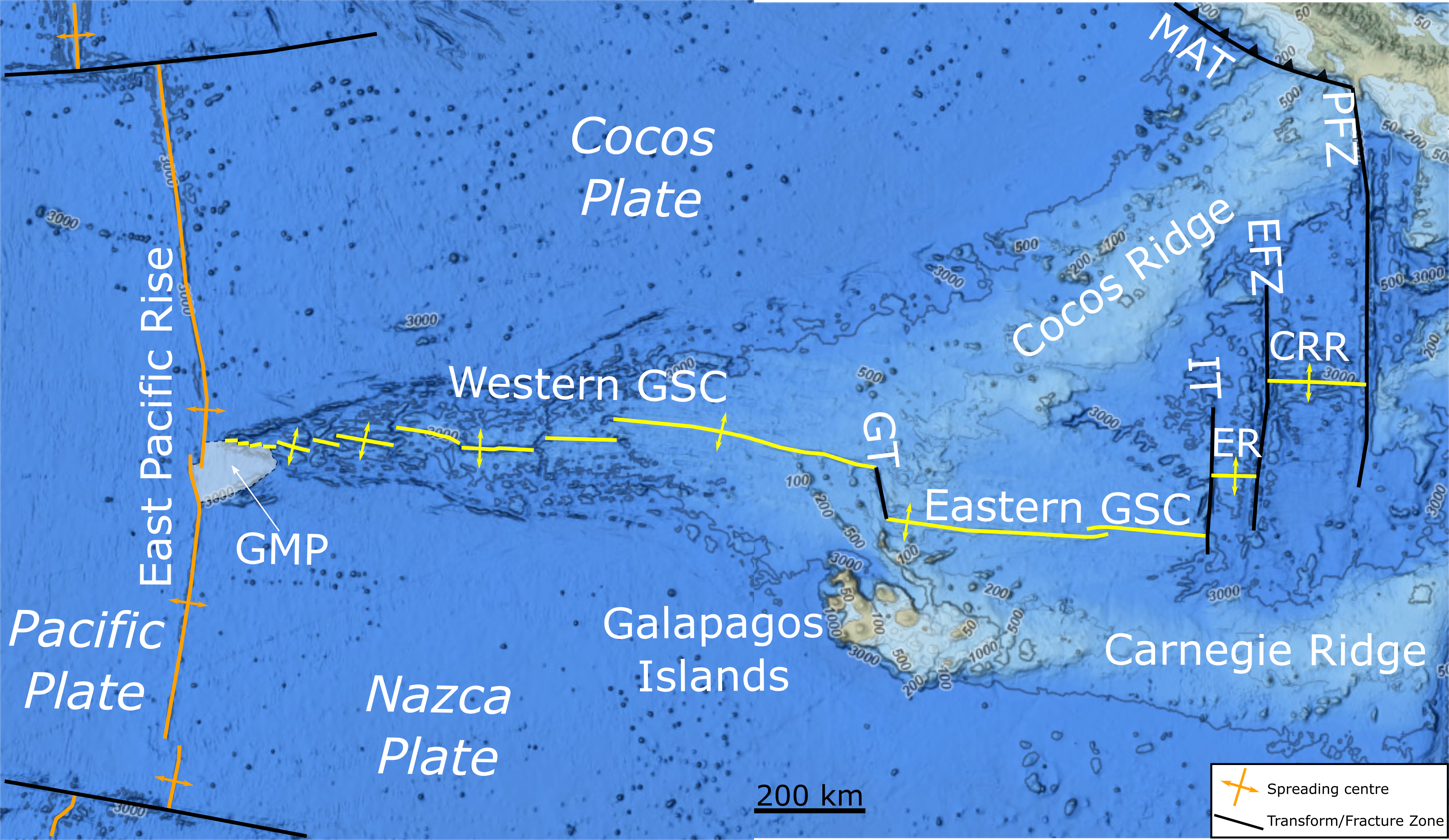
Map of the Cocos–Nazca spreading centre. Abbreviations used: GMP Galápagos microplate, GSC Galápagos spreading centre, GT Galápagos transform, IT Inca transform, EFZ Ecuador fracture zone, PFZ Panama fracture zone, MAT Middle America Trench, ER Ecuador Rise, CRR Costa Rica Rise

The Panama fracture zone is a major, active right lateral-moving transform fault and associated inactive fracture zone which forms part of the tectonic boundary between the Cocos plate and the Nazca plate, the Cocos–Nazca spreading centre. It is part of the triple junction between the Cocos plate, Nazca plate and Caribbean plate which is moving in the southeastern direction at 5.5 cm/yr. The active transform section runs from the Costa Rica Rise to the Middle America Trench.
