= Cocos plate =

Tectonic plate beneath the Pacific Ocean

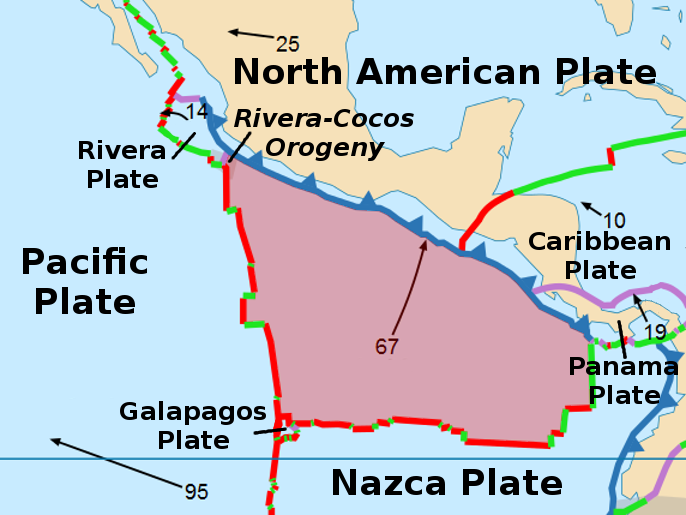
- Type: Minor
- Approximate area: 2,900,000 km^{2} (1,100,000 sq mi)
- Movement^{1}: north-east
- Speed^{1}: 67 mm/year
- Features: Cocos Island, Pacific Ocean
- ^{1}Relative to the African plate

The Cocos plate is a young oceanic tectonic plate beneath the Pacific Ocean off the west coast of Central America, named for Cocos Island, which rides upon it. The Cocos plate was created approximately 23 million years ago when the Farallon plate broke into two pieces, which also created the Nazca plate. The Cocos plate also broke into two pieces, creating the small Rivera plate. The Cocos plate is bounded to the northeast by the North American plate and the Caribbean plate. To the west it is bounded by the Pacific plate and to the south by the Nazca plate.

The only land above water on the Cocos plate is Cocos Island, which is administered by Costa Rica and lies approximately 550 km (342 mi; 297 nmi) southwest of the Costa Rican mainland.

== Geology ==
The Cocos plate was created by sea floor spreading along the East Pacific Rise and the Cocos Ridge, specifically in a complicated area geologists call the Cocos-Nazca spreading system. From the rise the plate is pushed eastward and pushed or dragged (perhaps both) under the less dense Caribbean plate, in the process called subduction. The subducted leading edge heats up and adds its water to the mantle above it. In the mantle layer called the asthenosphere, mantle rock melts to make magma, trapping superheated water under great pressure. As a result, to the northeast of the subducting edge lies the continuous arc of volcanos – also known as the Central America Volcanic Arc – stretching from Costa Rica to Guatemala, and a belt of earthquakes that extends farther north, into Mexico.

The northern boundary of the Cocos plate is the Middle America Trench. The eastern boundary is a transform fault, the Panama fracture zone. The southern boundary is a mid-oceanic ridge, the Cocos–Nazca spreading centre. The western boundary is another mid-ocean ridge, the East Pacific Rise.

A hotspot under the Galápagos Islands lies along the Galápagos Rise. (see Galápagos hotspot and Galápagos microplate)

The Rivera plate, north of the Cocos plate, is thought to have separated from the Cocos plate 5–10 million years ago. The boundary between the two plates appears to lack a definite transform fault, yet they are regarded as distinct. After its separation from the Cocos plate, the Rivera plate started acting as an independent microplate.

The devastating 1985 Mexico City earthquake and the 2017 Chiapas earthquake were results of the subduction of the Cocos plate beneath the North American plate. The devastating El Salvador earthquakes in January 2001 and February 2001 were generated by the subduction of this plate beneath the Caribbean plate.
