= Cocos Island =

Island designated as a National Park off the shore of Costa Rica

Cocos Island National Park
- IUCN category II (national park)
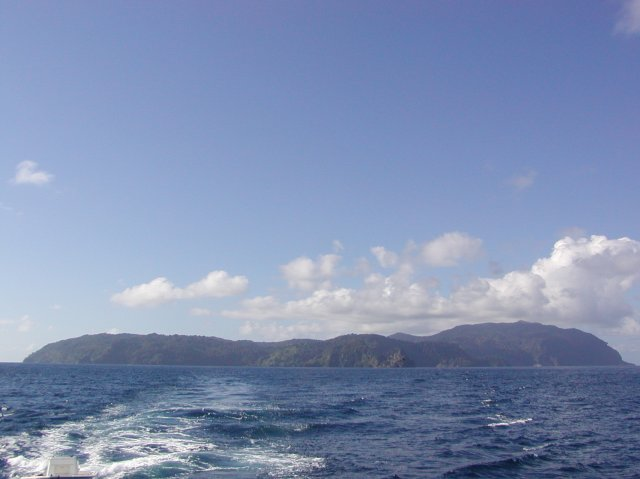
- Cocos Island

- Location within Central America
- Location: Approximately 550 km (340 mi) off the shore of Costa Rica
- Coordinates: 05°31′41″N 87°03′40″W
- Established: 1978

UNESCO World Heritage Site
- Criteria: Natural: ix, x
- Reference: 820
- Inscription: 1997 (21st Session)
- Extensions: 2002

Ramsar Wetland
- Official name: Isla del Coco
- Designated: 10 April 1998
- Reference no.: 940

Isla del Coco
- District
- Interactive map of Isla del Coco
- Isla del Coco district location in Costa Rica
- Country: Costa Rica
- Province: Puntarenas
- Canton: Puntarenas
- Creation: 27 April 1970

Area
  - Total: 23.52 km^{2} (9.08 sq mi)
- Elevation: 0 m (0 ft)
- Time zone: UTC−06:00
- Postal code: 60110

Cocos Island (Spanish: Isla del Coco) is a volcanic island in the Pacific Ocean administered by Costa Rica, approximately 550 km (342 mi; 297 nmi) southwest of the Costa Rican mainland. It constitutes the 11th of the 15 districts of Puntarenas Canton of the Province of Puntarenas. With an area of approximately 23.85 km^{2} (9.21 sq mi), the island is roughly rectangular in shape. It is the southernmost point of geopolitical North America if non-continental islands are included, and the only landmass above water on the Cocos tectonic plate.

The island has been designated a Costa Rican National Park since 1978 and has no inhabitants other than park rangers. Surrounded by deep waters with counter-currents, Cocos Island is admired by scuba divers for its populations of hammerhead sharks, rays, dolphins and other large marine species. The wet climate and oceanic qualities give Cocos an ecological character that is not shared with either the Galápagos Archipelago or other islands in the eastern Pacific, such as Malpelo, Gorgona or Coiba. Because of the unique ecology of the island and its surrounding waters, Cocos Island National Park became a UNESCO World Heritage Site in 1997. It can only be reached by sea, which usually takes 36 to 48 hours.

== History ==
=== Prehistory ===
The island is believed to have been uninhabited by humans prior to European discovery. However, there has been little archaeological investigation into oceanic eastern Pacific islands, including Cocos Island. This is due to the fragile environments on such islands, which for many years have been untouched by humans, and because these islands are at a considerable distance from islands that had Polynesian populations. Likewise, Indigenous Americans on the west coast of the continent were not known to inhabit any remote eastern Pacific islands. In 2008, Cocos Island, the Desventuradas Islands, Galápagos Islands and Juan Fernández Islands (all uninhabited when discovered by Europeans) were surveyed by archaeologists from the Australian National University. Their investigation found that the Galápagos Islands may have been visited by a Polynesian vessel, but it is unclear what their findings were for Cocos Island.

=== Discovery and early cartography ===
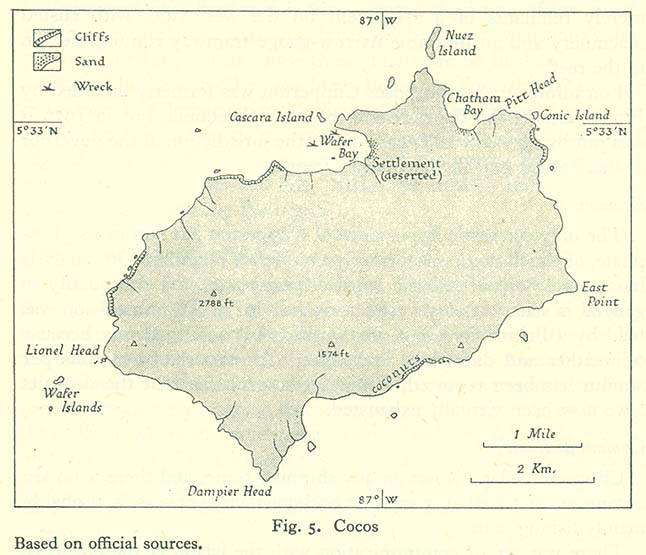
Cocos Island

In his Historia general y natural de las Indias (1535, expanded in 1851 from his previously unpublished papers), Gonzalo Fernández de Oviedo y Valdés discusses the discovery of the island by his contemporary, Spanish navigator Juan de Cabezas (also known as Juan de Grado), in 1526. D. Lievre, Una isla desierta en el Pacífico; la isla del Coco in Los viajes de Cockburn y Lievre por Costa Rica (1962: 134) tells that the first document with the name "Isle de Coques" is a map painted on parchment, called that of Henry II, that appeared in 1542 during the reign of Francis I of France. The planisphere of Nicolas Desliens (1556, Dieppe) places this Ysle de Coques about one and a half degrees north of the Equator.

Willem Blaeu's Grand Atlas, originally published in 1662, has a colour world map on the back of its front cover which shows I. de Cocos right on the Equator. Frederik De Witt's Atlas, 1680 shows it similarly. The Hondius Broadside map of 1590 shows I. de Cocos at 2 degrees and 30 minutes north latitude, while in 1596 Theodore de Bry showed the Galápagos Islands near 6 degrees north of the Equator. Emanuel Bowen, in A Complete system of Geography, Volume II (London, 1747: 586), states that the Galápagos islands stretch 5 degrees north of the Equator.

James Colnett, surveying eastern Pacific islands for British whaling interests, visited Cocos Island in 1793 and took on board his ship two thousand coconuts. He left a boar and sow, and a male and female goat. George Vancouver, arriving two years later, anchored his ships Discovery and Chatham in what is now called Chatham Bay. He took on water, wood, and a great number of coconuts. Before leaving he had the date of their arrival with the names of the ships and their commanders cut on a rock, joining the one single inscription that was already there. Both Colnett and Vancouver published charts in 1798. Among Colnett's charts was a "Plan of the Island Cocos". Vancouver's chart of the Sandwich Islands (Hawaii) contained an inset of Cocos Island. Captain Edward Belcher anchored at Chatham Bay in 1838. He observed that whalers had cut all the wood fit for fuel and that the only coconut trees seen were inaccessible. He added his ship's name to the growing number of inscriptions.

With the notable exception of the Galápagos Islands, there was a lack of scientific research into oceanic eastern Pacific islands prior to the 20th century. Publication The American Naturalist stated in 1891, "we know nothing at all about the fauna and flora of the isolated Clipperton Island and Malpelo; we hardly know anything about Cocos Island, which seems to be in many respects quite different from the others, having a more tropical appearance."

=== Administrative history ===
Cocos Island was annexed by Costa Rica in 1832 by decree No. 54 of the Constitutional Assembly of the newly independent country. During the 1830s and 1840s whalers anchored at Cocos Island for water and wood until whaling shifted to other areas of the Pacific.

In October 1863, the ship Adelante marooned 426 Tongan former slaves on the island when it was discovered that they had contracted smallpox and were a danger to her crew. By the time the vessel Tumbes arrived to rescue them one month later, only 38 survivors were found, the rest having perished from smallpox (see ʻAta).

In 1897, the Costa Rican government named the German adventurer and treasure hunter August Gissler the first Governor of Cocos Island and allowed him to establish a short-lived colony there.

On May 12, 1970, the insular territory of Cocos Island was incorporated administratively by means of Executive Decree No. 27, making it the eleventh district of Puntarenas canton of the Puntarenas Province.

As a district, the island has the postal code of 60110.

The island's 33 residents, all of them Costa Rican park rangers, were allowed to vote for the first time in Costa Rica's February 5, 2006, election. However, the rangers are not considered permanent residents of the district, therefore the census data considers the island to be uninhabited.

=== Piracy and hidden treasures ===
Cocos Island has featured heavily in many tales of pirate lore and buried treasure. The first claims of treasure buried on the island came from a woman named Mary Welch, who claimed that 350 tons of gold (about $16 billion in today's money) raided from Spanish galleons had been buried on the island by Captain Bennett Graham, a naval officer who had become a pirate in 1818. She had been a member of a pirate crew led by Captain Graham, and was transported to an Australian penal colony for her crimes. She possessed a chart showing where Graham's treasure was supposed to be hidden. On her release, she returned to the island with an expedition but had no success in finding anything, as the points of reference in the chart had disappeared.

Another pirate supposed to have buried treasure on the island was the Portuguese Benito Bonito, who began terrorizing the west coast of the Americas around 1818. Though Bonito was hunted down and executed, his treasure was never retrieved.

Perhaps the best-known of the treasure legends tied to the island is that of the fabled Treasure of Lima. In 1820, with the army of José de San Martín approaching Lima, Viceroy José de la Serna is supposed to have entrusted treasure from the city to British trader Captain William Thompson for safekeeping until the Spaniards could secure the country. Instead of waiting in the harbor as they were instructed, Thompson and his crew killed the viceroy's men and sailed to Cocos, where they allegedly buried the treasure. Shortly afterwards, they were apprehended by a Spanish warship. All of the crew except Thompson and his first mate were executed for piracy. The two said they would show the Spaniards where they had hidden the treasure in return for their lives, but after landing on Cocos, they escaped into the forest and were never recaptured.

Hundreds of attempts to find treasure on the island have failed. Several early expeditions were mounted on the basis of claims by a man named Keating, who was supposed to have befriended Thompson. On one trip, Keating was said to have retrieved gold and jewels from the treasure. German adventurer August Gissler lived on the island for most of the period from 1889 until 1908, hunting the treasure, but only found a few gold coins. British Antarctic explorer Aeneas Mackintosh launched a treasure-hunting expedition to Cocos in 1910, without success.

=== Present status and international distinctions ===
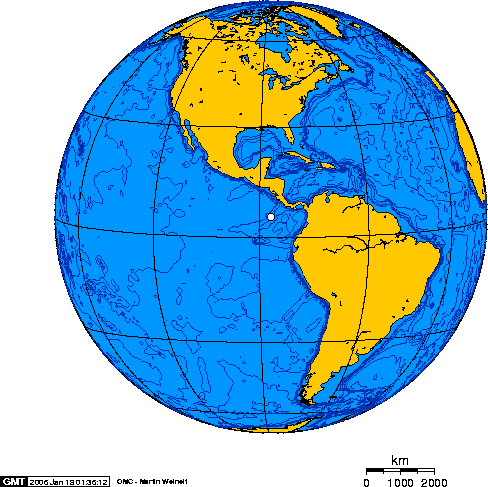
Orthographic projection centred over Cocos Island

Cocos Island was declared a Costa Rican National Park by means of an executive decree in 1978 and designated a World Heritage Site by UNESCO in 1997. In 2002, the World Heritage Site designation was extended to include an expanded marine zone of 1,997 km^{2} (771 sq mi). In addition, it is included in the list of Wetlands of International Importance. In 2009, Cocos Island was short-listed as a candidate for the New7Wonders of Nature by the New7Wonders of the World Foundation, ranking second in the island category.

Cocos Island was named one of the best 10 scuba diving spots in the world by the Professional Association of Diving Instructors. Dive sites around the island include Bajo Alcyone, known for hammerhead sharks, Manuelina Garden, a coral garden; and Dos Amigos Grande which has a natural underwater arch. The island lies where the deep and shallow waters meet, and large pelagic fish are common in its waters, including large schools of hammerhead sharks. Smaller reef species live on one of the most extensive coral reefs in the southeastern Pacific. Famous oceanographer Jacques Cousteau visited the island several times and in 1994 called it "the most beautiful island in the world". The island's waters face threats including illegal large-scale fishing and poaching.

The only persons allowed to live on Cocos Island are Costa Rican park rangers who reside in encampments at Wafer Bay and Chatham Bay. Access by civilians is very limited; tourists and ship crew members are allowed ashore only with permission of island rangers, and are not permitted to camp, stay overnight or collect any flora, fauna or minerals from the island. Occasional amateur radio DXpeditions are allowed to visit.

The island is also very popular in pirate lore. It is said that over 300 expeditions have searched for buried treasure there, such as the hoard of Benito Bonito, the Treasure of Lima, and many others. Some small caches have been discovered, leading many to believe that the stories of vast pirate treasures are true, though the majority of searches have been unsuccessful. Treasure hunting is strictly prohibited by the Costa Rican government and permits are not being issued.

==== Hermandad Marine Reserve ====
In 2022 Ecuadorean President Guillermo Lasso announced the expansion of the Galápagos Marine Reserve by 50%, adding 23,000 sq mi (60,000 km^{2}) to protect submarine mountains northeast of the islands as the Hermandad Marine Reserve. It will connect with the protected area around Cocos Island.

== Geology and landscape ==
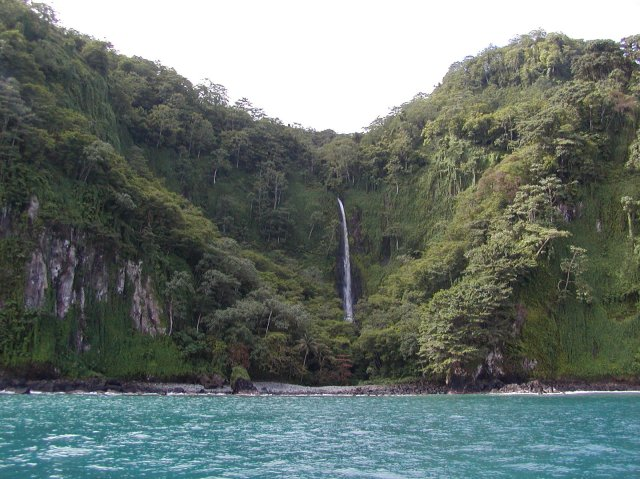
A waterfall at Wafer Bay, Cocos Island

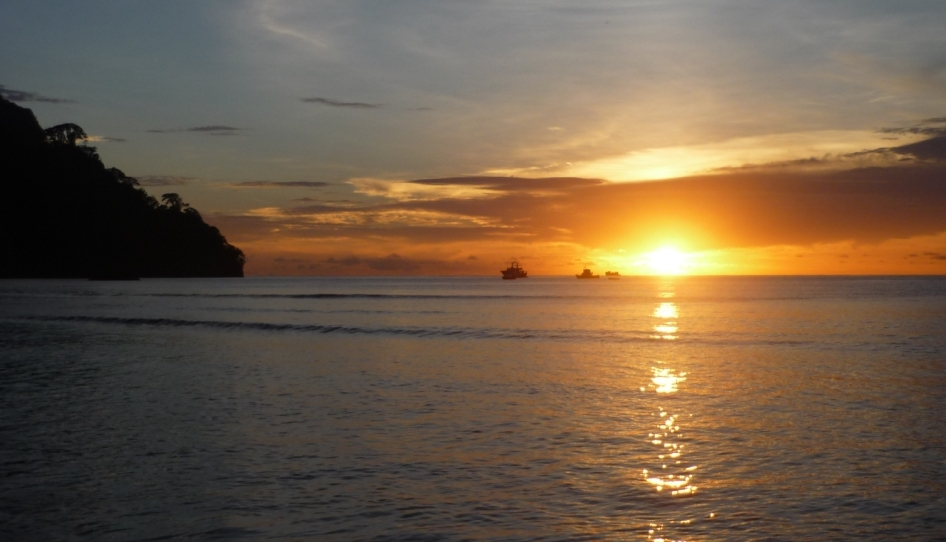
Wafer Bay sunset

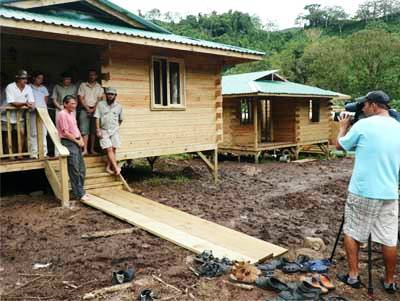
Cabins for park rangers made by volunteers under the technical direction of architect Ibo Bonilla

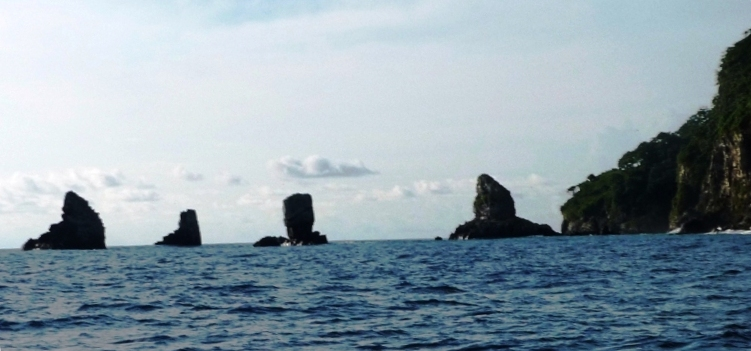
Stacks known as "The Moai"

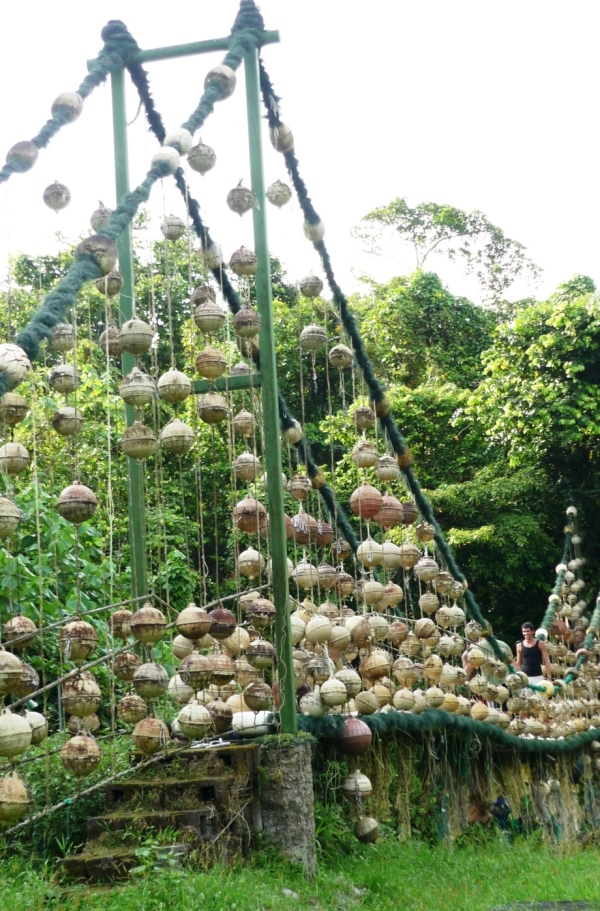
Genius River bridge, made with marine debris by Tico artist "Pancho"

Cocos Island is an oceanic island of both volcanic and tectonic origin. It is the only emergent island of the Cocos Plate, one of the minor tectonic plates. Potassium–argon dating established the age of the oldest rocks between 1.91 and 2.44 million years and it is composed primarily of basalt, which is formed by cooling lava. Cocos Island is the emergent summit of a Pliocene and Pleistocene shield volcano along the central part of the aseismic Cocos Ridge. It contains a caldera inside which is a lava dome of trachytic composition. The most recent eruptions on Cocos Island originated from northeast-trending fissures which were the sources of lava flows.

The island is approximately rectangular in shape, measuring about 8 km × 3 km (5 mi × 2 mi) with a perimeter of around 23.3 km (14.5 mi). The landscape is mountainous and irregular; the highest point is Cerro Iglesias, at 575.5 m (1,888 ft). In spite of its mountainous character, there are flatter areas between 200–260 m (660–850 ft) in elevation in the center of the island, which are said to be a transitional stage of the geomorphological cycle of V-shaped valleys.

Cocos Island has a number of short rivers and streams that drain abundant rainfall into four bays, three of them on the north side (Wafer, Chatham and Weston). The largest rivers are the Genio and the Pittier, which drain their water into Wafer Bay. Sheer, 90-metre (300 ft) cliffs ring much of the island, preventing convenient access except at a few beaches; the easiest point of entry is at Chatham Bay. The mountainous landscape and the tropical climate combine to create over 200 waterfalls throughout the island. The island's soils are classified as entisols, which are highly acidic and would be easily eroded by the island's high rainfall on the steep slopes were it not for the dense forest coverage.

=== Climate ===
Cocos island has a tropical rainforest climate (Köppen: Af), similar to that of the Colombian Chocó and mostly determined by the Intertropical Convergence Zone, which creates constant cloudiness and precipitation throughout the year. As in the Chocó, the North Equatorial Countercurrent from the central Pacific Ocean converges on the island and makes the climate very warm and exceptionally rainy with an average annual temperature of 26.6 °C (79.9 °F) and an average annual rainfall of over 7,000 mm (276 in) – comparable to Andagoya or Buenaventura. Rainfall remains high throughout the year, although lowers somewhat from January through March and again during late September and October.

Climate data for Cocos island
Month	Jan	Feb	Mar	Apr	May	Jun	Jul	Aug	Sep	Oct	Nov	Dec	Year
Mean daily maximum °C (°F)	28.0 (82.4)	29.0 (84.2)	29.0 (84.2)	29.0 (84.2)	29.0 (84.2)	28.0 (82.4)	28.0 (82.4)	28.0 (82.4)	28.0 (82.4)	27.0 (80.6)	27.0 (80.6)	28.0 (82.4)	28.2 (82.7)
Daily mean °C (°F)	26 (79)	27.5 (81.5)	27.5 (81.5)	27.5 (81.5)	27.0 (80.6)	26.0 (78.8)	26.0 (78.8)	26.0 (78.8)	26.0 (78.8)	25.5 (77.9)	25.5 (77.9)	26 (79)	26.4 (79.5)
Mean daily minimum °C (°F)	24.0 (75.2)	26.0 (78.8)	26.0 (78.8)	26.0 (78.8)	25.0 (77.0)	24.0 (75.2)	24.0 (75.2)	24.0 (75.2)	24.0 (75.2)	24.0 (75.2)	24.0 (75.2)	24.0 (75.2)	24.6 (76.3)
Average rainfall mm (inches)	585.4 (23.05)	348.4 (13.72)	235.1 (9.26)	470.1 (18.51)	857.5 (33.76)	938.2 (36.94)	806.2 (31.74)	674.3 (26.55)	753.9 (29.68)	793.0 (31.22)	625.9 (24.64)	555.4 (21.87)	7,643.4 (300.94)

== Ecology ==
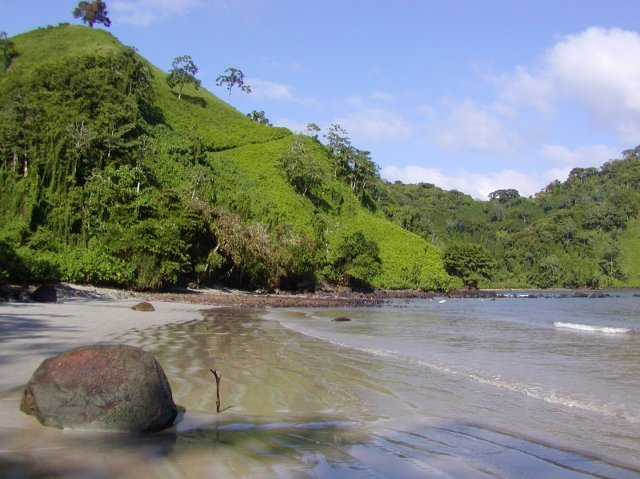
Chatham beach on Cocos Island

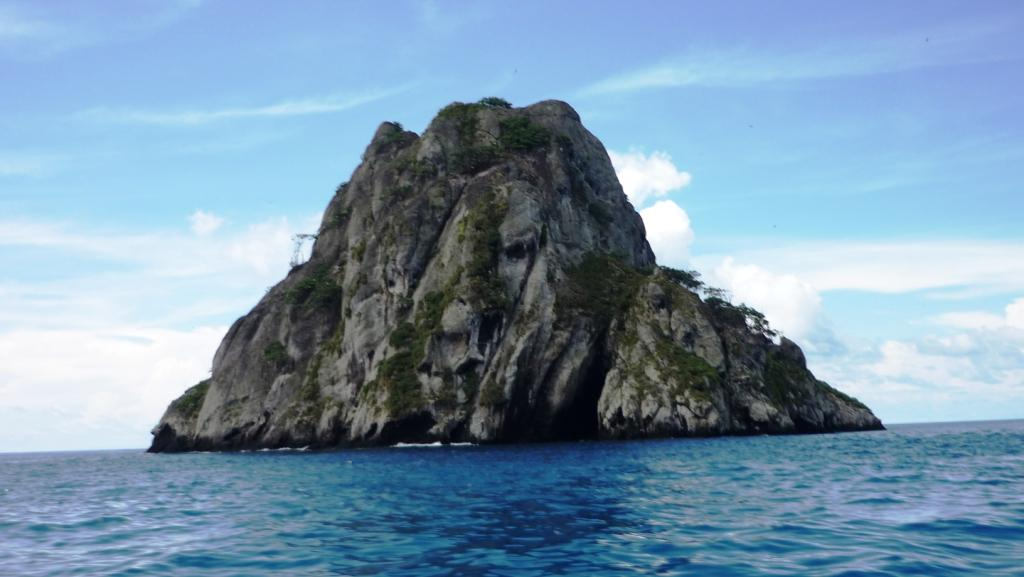
The islet Manuelita is a popular site for diving and observing marine species

Cocos Island is home to dense tropical moist forests. It is the only oceanic island in the eastern Pacific region with such rain forests and their characteristic types of flora and fauna. The cloud forests present at its higher elevations are also unique in the eastern Pacific. The island was never linked to a continent, so the flora and fauna arrived via long-distance dispersal from the Americas, and the island therefore has a high proportion of endemic species.

=== Flora ===
The island has 235 known species of flowering plants, of which 70 are endemic. A good comprehensive study on the flora of the island is provided in the journal Proceedings of the California Academy of Sciences. Additionally, 74 species of ferns and fern allies (lycopodiophytes and pteridophytes), 128 species of mosses and liverworts, 90 species of fungi and 41 species of slime molds have been reported. Nevertheless, more exhaustive investigations are expected to reveal many more species.

The island has three main plant communities. The coastal forests extend from the coast up to 50 m (160 ft) elevation. Purple coral tree (Erythrina fusca), coconut palm (Cocos nucifera), and pond-apple (Annona glabra) are the predominant trees, with an understory of ferns, shrubs of the Rubiaceae and Solanaceae families, sedges and grasses, and herbaceous plants of the Leguminosae and Malvaceae families.

The inland forests extend from 50 to 500 m (160 to 1,640 ft) elevation. "Palo de hierro" or huriki (Sacoglottis holdridgei), "avocado" (Ocotea insularis) and the endemic Cecropia pittieri are the most common canopy trees. The trees are festooned at all levels with epiphytic plants, including orchids, ferns, bromeliads and mosses. The understory includes sedges such as Hypolitrum amplum and various species of ferns and tree ferns, including Cyathea armata and Danaea media. The palm Euterpe precatoria is also common. Cloud forests are found at the highest elevations, over 500 m (1,600 ft), where Melastoma spp. are predominant.

The general vegetation of Cocos Island has greatly changed since the island was first named and described by Europeans. Captain Wafer, who visited the island in 1685 and whose name was given to the landing place, describes extensive coconut groves extending inland into the interior of the island. Thor Heyerdahl posited that it was very unlikely that these groves developed naturally, and that pre-European man must once have cleared considerable areas in the ravine bottoms and interior plateaus and ridges, utilizing the clearings for coconut plantations of substantial extent. Heyerdahl theorized that these plantations were used to provide fresh liquid and food for pre-Columbian voyages (made by balsa rafts using guara navigation) between Guatemala and northwestern South America. After the Spanish conquest and its consequences, these voyages ended and the tropical jungle recovered the land that had been laboriously cleared by early human hands. There is, however, no concrete archeological evidence of human habitation before European contact.

=== Fauna ===
==== Terrestrial ====
The island has over 400 known species of insects, of which 65 (16%) are endemic. The greatest diversity is found among the Lepidoptera and Formicidae. Over 50 species of other arthropods have been described (spiders, centipedes, millipedes, and isopods).

Two species of lizard are found on the island, the Cocos Island anole (Anolis townsendi) and the Pacific least gecko (Sphaerodactylus pacificus); both are endemic. No amphibians have been reported.

Nearly 90 bird species have been reported. The island and neighboring rocks are home to large nesting colonies of migratory seabirds, including the Cocos booby (Sula brewsteri), red-footed booby (Sula sula), great frigatebird (Fregata minor), white tern (Gygis alba) and brown noddy (Anous stolidus). Seven species of land birds inhabit the island, including three endemics: the Cocos cuckoo (Coccyzus ferrugineus), Cocos flycatcher (Nesotriccus ridgwayi) and Cocos finch (Pinaroloxias inornata), with the latter one being the only member of its genus. The island has been designated an Important Bird Area (IBA) by BirdLife International.

The island has no native land mammal species, but humans have introduced five: pigs, deer, goats, cats, and rats. Because they harm the local ecosystems by either foraging native flora or preying on native fauna, they are the subject of control efforts.

==== Marine ====
The rich coral reef, volcanic tunnels, caves, massifs and deeper waters surrounding Cocos Island are home to more than 30 species of coral, 60 species of crustaceans, 600 species of molluscs and over 300 species of fish. These include large populations of yellowfin tuna (Thunnus albacares), giant mantas (Manta birostris), sailfish (Istiophorus platypterus) and sharks, such as whitetip reef shark (Triaenodon obesus) and scalloped hammerhead shark (Sphyrna lewini). The largest of all species of fish is also present, the whale shark (Rhincodon typus). In December 2017, a female tiger shark (a species that returned to the waters of Isla del Coco in 2012, after 30 years of not being seen in the area) killed New Yorker Rohina Bhandari while she was scuba diving in Manuelita in the Isla del Coco National Park.

Other large marine animals include humpback whales (Megaptera novaeangliae), orcas (Orcinus orca), pilot whales (Globicephala macrorhynchus), bottlenose dolphins (Tursiops truncatus) and sea lions (Zalophus californianus).

There are also reptiles: hawksbill turtles (Eretmochelys imbricata), green turtles (Chelonia mydas) and olive ridley turtles (Lepidochelys olivacea).

=== Habitats threatened ===
The island's largely unperturbed habitats are, nonetheless, under growing human pressure. Illegal poaching of large marine species in and around its protected waters has become a main concern. Growing local and worldwide demand for tuna, shark fin soup and other seafood is threatening the island's fragile ecosystems. The government of Costa Rica has been openly accused of passivity and even benefiting corruptly from illegal shark fin and other seafood trade to large markets, such as China and other Asian countries. The government has shown some willingness to protect the island's natural riches and prosecute poachers. However, efforts to effectively patrol the waters and enforce environmental laws face big financial and bureaucratic difficulties, as well as being prone to the corruption of local, national and international authorities.

Recent events show that large-scale illegal poaching keeps happening. Despite initial hope in stopping and charging poachers, who have been caught with abundant evidence, they have often been quickly released under suspicious circumstances. Also, efforts to raise funds for protection have been dwarfed.

Marvin Orlando Cerdas, a judge with the local Puntarenas Court of Justice, obscurely allowed 22 poachers caught red-handed to escape the country. Also under highly suspicious and allegedly corrupt circumstances, District Attorney Michael Morales Molina stopped the auction for public benefit of confiscated goods immediately after the spokesman of the large illegal poaching ship Tiuna simply made the request.

== In fiction ==
The book Desert Island proposed the highly detailed theory that Daniel Defoe used the Isla del Coco as an accurate model for his descriptions of the island inhabited by the marooned Robinson Crusoe. However, Defoe placed Crusoe's island not in the Pacific, but rather off the coast of Venezuela in the Atlantic Ocean.

Robinson's neighbouring Terra Firma is shown on the colour map of Joannes Jansson (Amsterdam) depicting the northeastern corner of South America, entitled Terra Firma et Novum Regnum Granatense et Popayan. It belongs to the early group of plates printed by Willem Blaeu from 1630 onwards. The property called Terra Firma was the Isthmus of Darien.

The stories of pirates and buried treasure associated with the island are reputed to have been the inspiration for the novel Treasure Island, by Robert Louis Stevenson.

== See also ==
- Island of the Sharks
