= Cocos–Nazca spreading centre =

Spreading centre under central eastern Pacific Ocean

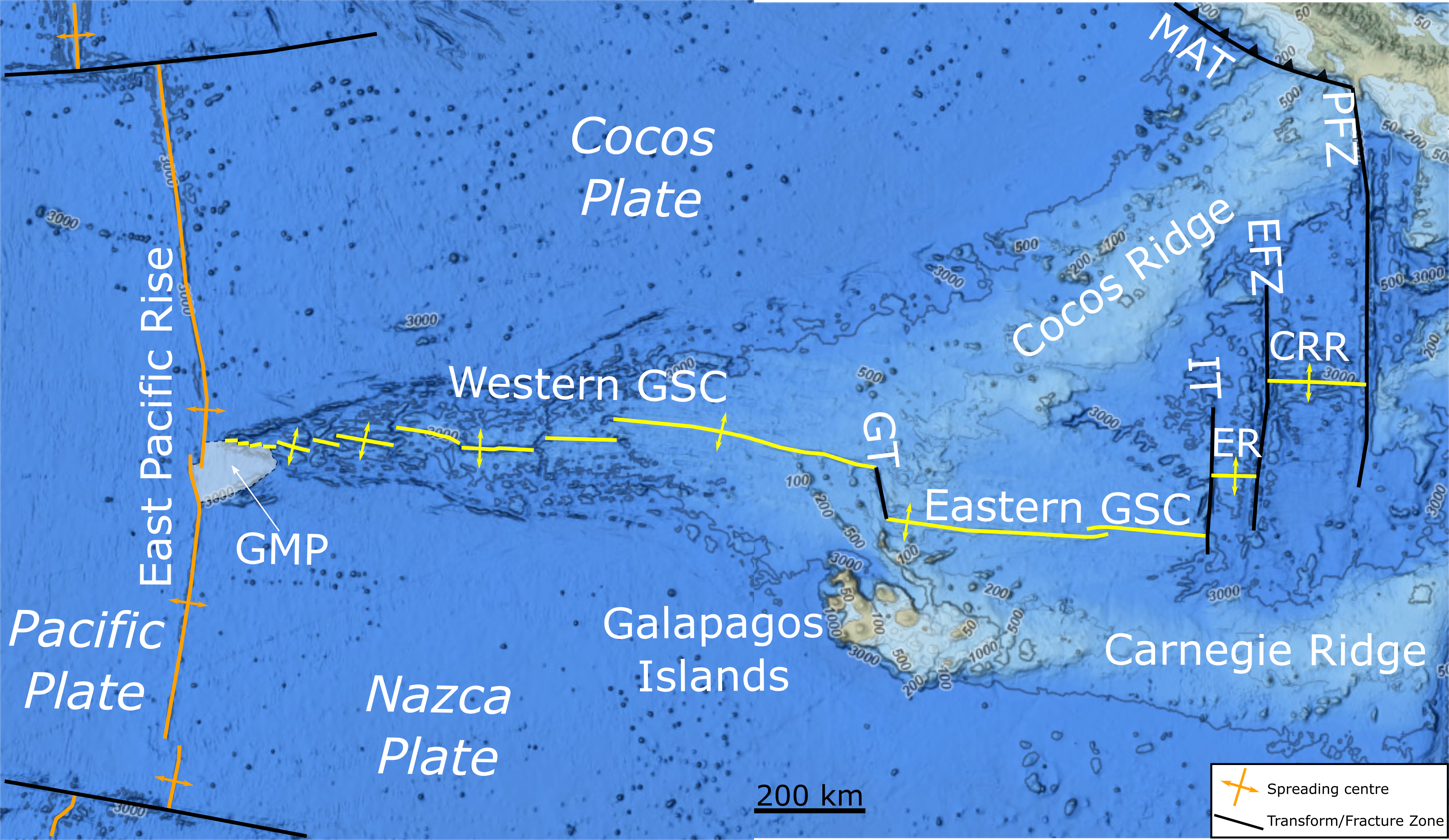
Map of the Cocos–Nazca spreading centre. Abbreviations used: GMP Galápagos microplate, GSC Galápagos spreading centre, GT Galápagos transform, IT Inca transform, EFZ Ecuador fracture zone, PFZ Panama fracture zone, MAT Middle America Trench, ER Ecuador Rise, CRR Costa Rica Rise

The Cocos–Nazca spreading centre (CNSC, Cocos–Nazca spreading system) is the divergent boundary between the Cocos and Nazca plates. It extends from close to the East Pacific Rise northwest of the Galápagos Islands, to the southeastern end of the Middle America Trench offshore Panama. The western part of this boundary is formed by the west–east Galápagos spreading centre, with the eastern part formed of two short spreading segments and three large transform segments, including the Panama fracture zone.

== Western CNSC ==
The western part of the CNSC is formed by the Galápagos spreading centre (GSC). It extends for about 1,800 km (1,100 mi) and consists of a series of west-east trending spreading segments. Offsets between adjacent segments are marked by overlap without transform fault development, with exception of the highly oblique Galápagos transform. This structure is not thought to be a true transform fault, as it is not orthogonal to the spreading axes that it links. The GSC is divided into two sections, linked by the Galápagos transform. The western GSC runs from the Galápagos triple junction, close to the East Pacific Rise, where the Galápagos microplate is developed, for about 1,200 km (750 mi) eastwards to the northern end of the Galápagos transform. The eastern GSC extends from the southern end of the Galápagos transform eastwards to the Inca transform. The GSC shows evidence of interaction with the Galápagos hotspot that lies just to its south, affecting its morphology. The eastern GSC is interpreted to have undergone a series of ridge jumps, moving southwards towards the hotspot, creating the Galápagos transform in the process.

== Eastern CNSC ==
The eastern part of the CNSC consists of three major transform faults and associated fracture zones, the Inca transform, the Ecuador fracture zone and the Panama fracture zone, together bounding two short spreading centres, the Ecuador and Costa Rica rifts (rises). The Panama fracture zone links northwards to the Middle America Trench.
