= Divergent boundary =

Linear feature between two tectonic plates

Continental-continental divergent/constructive boundary

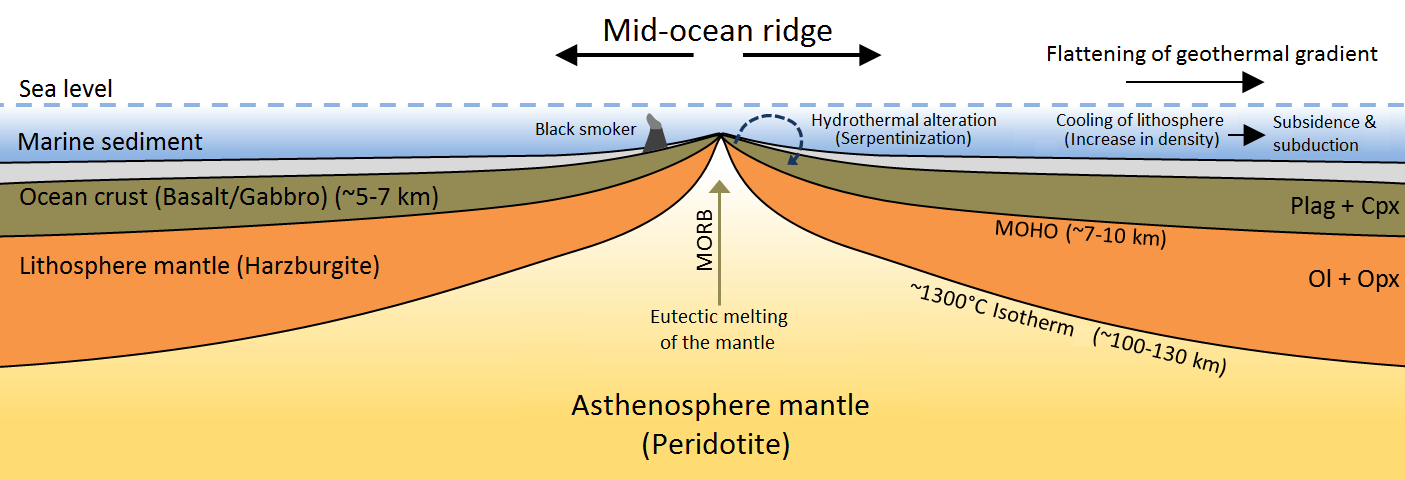
Oceanic divergent boundary: mid-ocean ridge (cross-section/cut-away view)

In plate tectonics, a divergent boundary or divergent plate boundary (also known as a constructive boundary or an extensional boundary) is a linear feature that exists between two tectonic plates that are moving away from each other. Divergent boundaries within continents initially produce rifts, which eventually become rift valleys. Most active divergent plate boundaries occur between oceanic plates and exist as mid-oceanic ridges.

Current research indicates that complex convection within the Earth's mantle allows material to rise to the base of the lithosphere beneath each divergent plate boundary. This supplies the area with huge amounts of heat and a reduction in pressure that melts rock from the asthenosphere (or upper mantle) beneath the rift area, forming large flood basalt or lava flows. Each eruption occurs in only a part of the plate boundary at any one time, but when it does occur, it fills in the opening gap as the two opposing plates move away from each other.

Over millions of years, tectonic plates may move many hundreds of kilometers away from both sides of a divergent plate boundary. Because of this, rocks closest to a boundary are younger than rocks further away on the same plate.

== Description ==
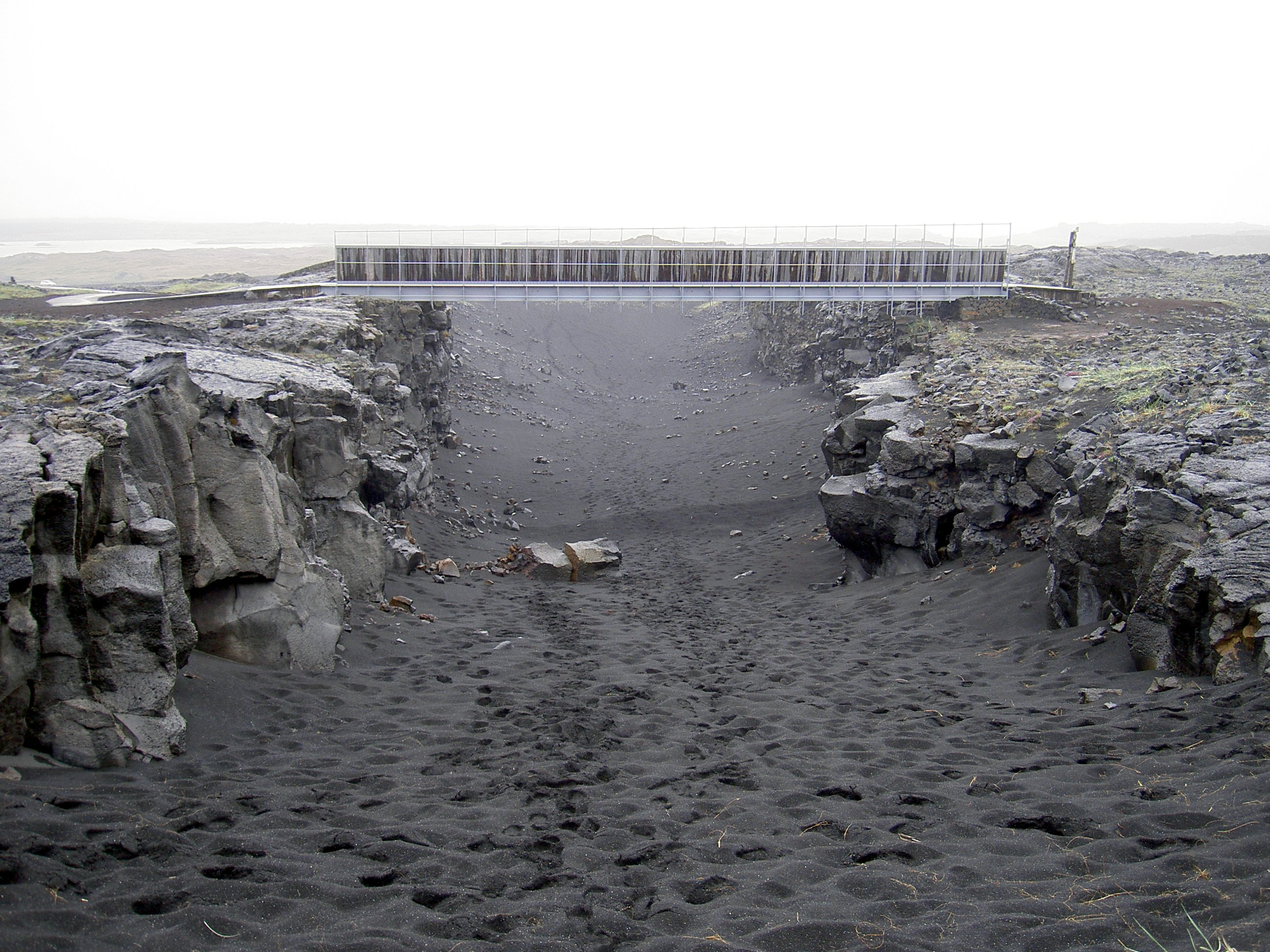
Bridge across the Reykjanes rift valley in southwest Iceland, that is part of the boundary between the Eurasian and North American continental tectonic plates.

At divergent boundaries, two plates move away from each other and the space that this creates is filled with new crustal material sourced from molten magma that forms below. The origin of new divergent boundaries at triple junctions is sometimes thought to be associated with the phenomenon known as hotspots. Here, exceedingly large convective cells bring very large quantities of hot asthenospheric material near the surface, and the kinetic energy is thought to be sufficient to break apart the lithosphere.

Divergent boundaries are typified in the oceanic lithosphere by the rifts of the oceanic ridge system, including the Mid-Atlantic Ridge and the East Pacific Rise, and in the continental lithosphere by rift valleys such as the famous East African Great Rift Valley. Divergent boundaries can create massive fault zones in the oceanic ridge system. Spreading is generally not uniform, so where spreading rates of adjacent ridge blocks are different, massive transform faults occur. These are the fracture zones, many bearing names, that are a major source of submarine earthquakes. A seafloor map will show a rather strange pattern of blocky structures that are separated by linear features perpendicular to the ridge axis. If one views the seafloor between the fracture zones as conveyor belts carrying the ridge on each side of the rift away from the spreading center the action becomes clear. Crest depths of the old ridges, parallel to the current spreading center, will be older and deeper... (from thermal contraction and subsidence).

It is at mid-ocean ridges that one of the key pieces of evidence forcing acceptance of the seafloor spreading hypothesis was found. Airborne geomagnetic surveys showed a strange pattern of symmetrical magnetic reversals on opposite sides of ridge centers. The pattern was far too regular to be coincidental as the widths of the opposing bands were too closely matched. Scientists had been studying polar reversals and the link was made by Lawrence W. Morley, Frederick John Vine and Drummond Hoyle Matthews in the Morley–Vine–Matthews hypothesis. The magnetic banding directly corresponds with the Earth's polar reversals. This was confirmed by measuring the ages of the rocks within each band. The banding furnishes a map in time and space of both spreading rate and polar reversals.

== Examples ==
Map of Earth's principal plates (divergent boundaries shown as red or pink lines)

- Mid-Atlantic Ridge
- Red Sea Rift
- Baikal Rift Zone – incipient plate boundary
- East African Rift – incipient plate boundary
- East Pacific Rise
- Gakkel Ridge
- Cocos–Nazca spreading centre
- Explorer Ridge
- Juan de Fuca Ridge
- Mid-Cayman Rise
- Pacific-Antarctic Ridge
- Southeast Indian Ridge

== Other plate boundary types ==
- Convergent boundary
- Transform boundary

== See also ==
- Seafloor spreading – Geological process at mid-ocean ridges
- Continental drift – Movement of Earth's continents relative to each other
- Subduction zone – Geological process at tectonic plate boundaries
