= Timeline of geology =

Chronological list of notable events in the history of the science of geology

Timeline of geology

== Early works ==
- c. 1025 – al-Biruni publishes the Kitāb fī Taḥqīq mā li-l-Hind (Researches on India), in which he discusses the geology of India and hypothesizes that it was once a sea.
- 1027 – Avicenna publishes The Book of Healing, in which he hypothesizes on two causes of mountains.

== 16th and 17th centuries ==
- Portuguese and Spanish explorers systematically measure magnetic declination to estimate the geographical longitude
- 1556 – Agricola publishes De re metallica. This book acts as the standard mining and assaying text for the next 250 years.
- 1596 – Abraham Ortelius, Flemish-Spanish cartographer, first envisages the continental drift theory.
- 1603 – Ulisse Aldrovandi coins the term Geology.
- 1669 – Nicolas Steno puts forward his theory that sedimentary strata had been deposited in former seas, and that fossils were organic in origin

== 18th century ==
- 1701 – Edmond Halley suggests using the salinity and evaporation of the Mediterranean to determine the age of the Earth
- 1743 – Dr Christopher Packe produces a geological map of south-east England
- 1746 – Jean-Étienne Guettard presents the first mineralogical map of France to the French Academy of Sciences.
- 1760 – John Michell suggests earthquakes are caused by one layer of rocks rubbing against another
- 1776 – James Keir suggests that some rocks, such as those at the Giant's Causeway, might have been formed by the crystallisation of molten lava
- 1779 – Comte de Buffon speculates that the Earth is older than the 6,000 years suggested by the Bible
- 1785 – James Hutton presents paper entitled Theory of the Earth – Earth must be old
- 1799 – William Smith produces the first large scale geological map, of the area around Bath

== 19th century ==
- 1809 – William Maclure conducts the first geological survey of the eastern United States
- 1813 – Georges Cuvier publishes his Essay on the Theory of the Earth, proposing catastrophism on the basis of his work in biostratigraphy
- 1830 – Sir Charles Lyell publishes book, Principles of Geology, which describes the world as being several hundred million years old
- 1837 – Louis Agassiz begins his glaciation studies which eventually demonstrate that the Earth has had at least one ice age
- 1841 – August Breithaupt, Vollstandiges Handbuch der Mineralogie
- 1848 – James Dwight Dana, Manual of Mineralogy
- 1862 – Lord Kelvin attempts to find the age of the Earth by examining its cooling time and estimates that the Earth is between 20 and 400 million years old
- 1884 – Marcel Alexandre Bertrand, Nappe and Thrust fault theory

== 20th century ==
- 1903 – George Darwin and John Joly claim that radioactivity is partially responsible for the Earth's heat
- 1907 – Bertram Boltwood proposes that the amount of lead in uranium and thorium ores might be used to determine the Earth's age and crudely dates some rocks to have ages between 410 and 2200 million years
- 1911 – Arthur Holmes uses radioactivity to date rocks, the oldest being 1.6 billion years old
- 1912 – Alfred Wegener proposes that all the continents once formed a single landmass called Pangaea that broke apart via continental drift
- 1912 – George Barrow maps zones of metamorphism (the Barrovian sequence) in southern Scotland
- 1913 – Albert A. Michelson measures tides in the solid body of the Earth
- 1915 – Pentti Eskola develops the concept of metamorphic facies
- 1928 – N. L. Bowen publishes The Evolution of the Igneous Rocks, revolutionizing experimental igneous petrology
- 1935 – Charles Richter invents a logarithmic scale to measure the magnitude of earthquakes ($M_L$)
- 1936 – Inge Lehmann discovers Earth's inner core through analysis of seismic waves.
- 1941 – Nickel-Strunz classification, Karl H. Strunz, Mineralogische Tabellen
- 1948–1959 – Felix Andries Vening Meinesz investigations show gravity anomalies, implying that the crust is moving (together with J.H.F. Umbgrove, B.G. Escher and Ph.H. Kuenen)
- 1951 – Alfred Rittmann links subduction, volcanism and the Wadati–Benioff zone
- 1953 – Maurice Ewing, Bruce Heezen, and Marie Tharp discover the Great Global Rift running along the Mid-Atlantic Ridge
- 1960 – Harry Hess proposes that new sea floor might be created at mid-ocean rifts and destroyed at deep sea trenches
- 1963 – Frederick Vine and Drummond Matthews explain the stripes of magnetized rocks with alternating magnetic polarities running parallel to mid-ocean ridges as due to sea floor spreading and the periodic geomagnetic field reversals (Vine–Matthews–Morley hypothesis)
- 1966 – Keiiti Aki discovers the seismic moment ($M_0$)
- 1979 – Thomas C. Hanks and Hiroo Kanamori, Moment magnitude scale ($M_W$), it succeeds the Richter magnitude scale
- 1980 – Physicist Luis Alvarez, his son, geologist Walter Alvarez, and others propose that the impact of a large extraterrestrial object caused the extinction of the dinosaurs at the end of the Cretaceous Period, about 66 million years ago.

== 21st century ==
- 2001 – Nickel-Strunz classification, Karl H. Strunz and Ernest H. Nickel, Strunz Mineralogical Tables 9 ed.

== See also ==
- History of geology
