= Geologic timeline =

Geologic timeline can refer to:

- The geologic time scale of Earth history.
- The historical development of the science of geology, as in the timeline of geology article.
