= International Mineralogical Association =

Scientific organization promoting mineralogy

- Abbreviation: IMA
- Formation: 1958
- Type: INGO
- Purpose: promote the science of mineralogy and to standardize the nomenclature of the 5000 plus known mineral species
- Headquarters: Tohoku University Aobayama North Campus
- Location: Sendai, Tōhoku region, Japan
- Region served: Worldwide
- Official language: English
- President: Eiji Ohtani
- Parent organization: International Council for Science (ICSU)
- Website: Official website

Founded in 1958, the International Mineralogical Association (IMA) is an international group of 40 national societies. The goal is to promote the science of mineralogy and to standardize the nomenclature of the 5000 plus known mineral species. The IMA is affiliated with the International Union of Geological Sciences (IUGS).

The Association supports the activities of Commissions and Working Groups involved on certain aspects of mineralogical practice and facilitates interactions among mineralogists by sponsoring and organising meetings. In particular, the IMA holds its general meeting every four years. The last meeting was scheduled in 2022 in Lyon, France.

== Presidents ==
The presidents of the IMA have been:

- since 2024: Eiji Ohtani
  - Tohoku University
- 2022–2024: Hans-Peter Schertl
  - Bochum University
- 2020–2022: Anhuai Lu
  - Peking University
- 2018–2020: Patrick Cordier
  - Université de Lille
- 2016–2018: Peter C. Burns
  - University of Notre Dame
- 2014–2016: Sergey V. Krivovichev
  - Saint Petersburg State University
- 2012–2014: Walter V. Maresch
  - Ruhr University Bochum
- 2010–2012: Ekkehart Tillmanns
  - Institute of Mineralogy and Crystallography, University of Vienna
  - Mineral: tillmannsite (IMA2001-010)
- 2006–2010: Takamitsu Yamanaka
  - Osaka University
- 2002–2006: Ian Parsons
  - University of Edinburgh
- 1998–2002: Anthony (Tony) J. Naldrett
  - University of Toronto
  - Mineral: naldrettite (IMA2004-007)
- 1994–1998: Stefano Merlino
  - University of Pisa
  - Mineral: merlinoite (IMA1976-046)
- 1990–1994: Xiande Xie
  - Guangzhou Institute of Geochemistry (Chinese Academy of Sciences)
  - Mineral: xieite (IMA2007-056)
- 1986–1990: Peter John Wyllie
  - California Institute of Technology (after 1984, Caltech) and University of Chicago (1965–1983)
  - Mineral: wyllieite (IMA1972-015)
- 1982–1986: Ivan Kostov (Nikolov) (1913–2004)
  - Sofia University and National Museum of Natural History (1974-1989)
  - Mineral: kostovite (IMA1965-002)
- 1978–1982: Claude (Jean Guy) Guillemin (1923–1994)
  - École des Mines de Paris (Mines ParisTech)
  - Mineral: guilleminite (IMA1964-031)
- 1974–1978: Vladimir Stepanovich Sobolev (1908–1982)
  - Novosibirsk State University
  - Mineral: sobolevite (IMA1982-042)
- 1970–1974: Karl Hugo Strunz (1910–2006)
  - Technische Universität Berlin
  - Mineral: strunzite (1958)
- 1964–1970: Cecil Edgar Tilley (1894–1973)
  - University of Cambridge (England)
  - Mineral: tilleyite (1933)
- 1960–1964: Daniel Jerome Fisher (1896–1988)
  - University of Chicago
  - Mineral: djerfisherite (IMA1965-028)
- 1958–1960: Robert Lüling Parker (1893–1973)
  - Swiss Federal Institute of Technology (ETH Zurich) and University of Zurich
  - Mineral: parkerite (1937)

== Medal ==
The IMA Medal for Excellence in Mineralogical Research was created in 2006. It is awarded for scientific excellence and eminence as represented by long-term outstanding scientific publication in the field of mineralogical sciences. It is one of the pre-eminent awards in mineralogical research and represents a life-time achievement award.

=== Medalists ===
- 2023 - Tetsuo Irifune
- 2022 - Patricia Dove
- 2021 - Robert Hazen
- 2020 - Georges Calas
- 2019 - Eiji Ohtani
- 2018 - Gordon E. Brown, Jr.
- 2017 - Emil Makovicky
- 2015 - Rod C. Ewing
- 2013 - Nikolay V. Sobolev
- 2011 - David H. Green
- 2009 - Frank C. Hawthorne
- 2008 - Charles Prewitt

== Working groups and commissions ==
The most active IMA commission is the Commission on New Minerals and Mineral Names (CNMMN). It was founded in 1959 to coordinate the assigning of new mineral names, revision of existing names and discreditation of invalid species. Traditionally, the validation procedure of new minerals is one of the chairman's tasks and the discreditation or revalidation procedure of invalid species are two of the vice-chairman's tasks. In July 2006 a merger between the CNMMN and the Commission on Classification of Minerals (CCM), initiated at the request of both commissions, resulted in the Commission on New Minerals, Nomenclature and Classification (CNMNC).

=== Chairmen of CNMNC ===
- Ferdinando Bosi (since mid-2022)
- Ritsuro Miyawaki (2018-2022)
- Ulf Hålenius (2015-2018); (since c. 2015); mineral: håleniusite-(La) (IMA 2003-028)
- Peter (Pete) A. Williams (2008 – 2014); mineral: petewilliamsite (IMA 2002-059)
  - Frédéric Hatert, vice-chairman (changes in existing nomenclature)
  - Marco Pasero, vice-chairman (general classification matters)
- Ernst A. J. Burke (2003 – August, 2008); mineral: ernstburkeite (IMA 2010-059)
  - Giovanni Ferraris, vice-chairman
- Joel Denison Grice (1995 – 2002); mineral: griceite (IMA 1986-043)
- Joseph (Joe) Anthony Mandarino (1983 – 1994); mineral: mandarinoite (IMA 1977-049)
  - Ernest (Ernie) H. Nickel, vice-chairman; mineral: ernienickelite (IMA 1993-002)
- Akira Kato (1975 – 1982); mineral: katoite (IMA 1982-080a)
- Michael (Mike) Fleischer (1959 – 1974); mineral: fleischerite (IMA 1962 s.p.)
  - Max Hey, vice-chairman
  - François Permingeat, secretary

== Member societies ==
Among the societies represented at the IMA are:

- Associación Mineralogica Argentina
- Bulgarian Mineralogical Society
- Ceska geolicka spolecnost
- Croatian Mineralogical Association
- Deutsche Mineralogische Gesellschaft
- Geological Society of Australia
- Geological Society of Greece, Committee of Economic Geology Mineralogy and Geochemistry
- Koninklijk Nederlands Geologisch Mijnbouwkundig Genootschap (Royal Geological and Mining Society of the Netherlands)
- Magyahoni Földtani Tarsulat (Hungarian Geological Society), Asvantyan-Geokémoai Szakosztally (Mineralogical and Geochemical Section)
- Mineralogical Association of Canada
- Mineralogical Association of South Africa
- Mineralogical Society of America
- Mineralogical Society of Denmark
- Mineralogical Society of Georgia
- Mineralogical Society of Great Britain and Ireland
- Mineralogical Society of India
- Mineralogical Society of Japan
- Mineralogical Society of Korea
- Mineralogical Society of Romania
- Mineralogical Society of Slovakia
- Mineralogical Society of Uzbekistan
- Norsk Geologisk Forening, Mineralogisk Gruppe
- New Zealand Geochemical and Mineralogical Society
- Österreichische Mineralogische Gesellschaft
- Polskie Towarzystwo Mineralogiczne
- Russian Mineralogical Society
- Schweizerische Mineralogische und Petrographische Gesellschaft
- Slovenian Geological Society, Mineralogical Branch
- Sociedad Española de Mineralogía
- Sociedade Brasileira de Geologia
- Sociedade Geologica de Portugal, Grupo de Mineralogia
- Società Italiana di Mineralogia e Petrologia
- Société Française de Minéralogie et de Cristallographie
- Suomen mineraloginen seura r.y
- The Chinese Society of Mineralogy, Petrology and Geochemistry
- The Mineralogical Society of Egypt
- The Swedish Mineralogical Society
- Ukrainian Mineralogical Association
- Union Minéralogique de Belgique

== See also ==
- List of minerals recognized by the International Mineralogical Association
  - List of minerals
