= Naldrettite =

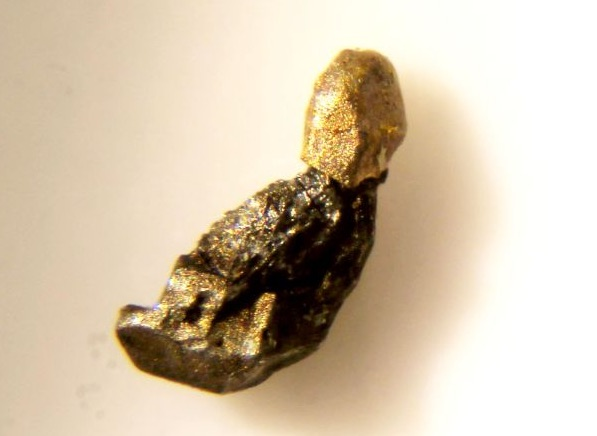

General
- Category: Sulfide mineral
- Formula: Pd_{2}Sb
- IMA symbol: Nld
- Strunz classification: 2.AC.25d
- Crystal system: Orthorhombic
- Crystal class: Dipyramidal (mmm); H-M Symbol: (2/m 2/m 2/m)
- Space group: Cmc2_{1}
- Unit cell: a = 3.3906(1), b = 17.5551(5) c = 6.957(2) [Å]; Z = 8

Identification
- Color: Appears creamy white in plane-polarized light
- Twinning: strain-induced polysynthetic
- Fracture: Irregular
- Tenacity: Ductile, Flexibly inelastic
- Mohs scale hardness: 4-5
- Luster: metallic
- Diaphaneity: opaque
- Density: 10.694(1) g/cm3
- Refractive index: in oil 1.515
- Pleochroism: non-pleochroic
- Melting point: 580 °C

Naldrettite is a mineral with a chemical formula of Pd_{2}Sb. It is named after Anthony J. Naldrett (born 1933), a professor at the University of Toronto, who has made significant contributions to the International Mineralogical Association (IMA). Naldrettite is a new intermetallic mineral from the Mesamax Northwest deposit, Ungava region, Québec, Canada. Mineralization takes place around the base of basaltic dyke margins. Naldrettite is economically important because of its chemical composition (Pd_{2}Sb). The sample in which the new mineral was discovered had high platinum group elements (PGEs) with palladium enrichment.

Naldrettite occurs as anhedral grains that are commonly attached to sulfide minerals and are associated with clinochlore. It belongs to the orthorhombic crystal system and is a part of the pyramidal class. This means that all of the edge lengths (a,b,c) of the unit cell are different in length and intersect at right angles to each other. The mineral is metallic, opaque, appears bright creamy white under plane polarized light, has weak bireflectance, and does not exhibit internal reflections.
