= Karl Hugo Strunz =

German mineralogist (1910–2006)

- Born: 24 February 1910; Weiden in der Oberpfalz, Kingdom of Bavaria
- Died: 19 April 2006 (aged 96); Unterwössen, Bavaria
- Education: Ludwig-Maximilians-Universität München; Technical University of Munich
- Known for: Nickel-Strunz classification
- Scientific career
- Fields: Mineralogy
- Workplaces: Technische Universität Berlin
- Thesis: Über strukturelle Beziehungen zwischen Phosphaten (Triphylin) und Silikaten (Olivin) und über die chemische Zusammensetzung von Ardennit und Narsarsukit (1933)

Karl Hugo Strunz (24 February 1910 – 19 April 2006) was a German mineralogist. He is best known for creating the Nickel-Strunz classification, the ninth edition of which was published together with Ernest Henry Nickel.

== Biography ==
Strunz was born on 24 February 1910 in Weiden in der Oberpfalz (Upper Palatinate, Bavaria, Germany). He attended the 'Goethe-Oberrealschule Regensburg', a high school with a strong scientific background in Regensburg. In 1929, he began his studies in natural sciences at the Ludwig-Maximilians-Universität München and specialized in Mineralogy. He received his doctorate degree in philosophy in 1933 from the Ludwig-Maximilians-Universität München and two years later his doctorate degree in technical sciences from the Technical University of Munich.

After he graduated he was granted a research scholarship at the Victoria University (Manchester, England) where he worked with William Lawrence Bragg. He then went on to the ETH Zurich (Switzerland), where he was an assistant to Paul Niggli.

In 1937 Strunz went on to the Mineralogical Museum of the Museum für Naturkunde (Berlin, Germany), where he was Paul Ramdohr's assistant. Two years later, in 1939, he was appointed professor to the 'Friedrich-Wilhelm University', now the Humboldt University of Berlin. He held that position beyond the end of the second world war in 1946.

In 1946, he moved on to the University of Regensburg where he established a department for mineralogy and geology.

In 1951, he was appointed to Technische Universität Berlin as a professor, where he established a department for mineralogy. He would keep this position until becoming a professor emeritus in 1978.

Strunz died on 19 April 2006 in Unterwössen (Bavaria, Germany).

== Work ==
Strunz developed a classification for minerals that is based on their chemical composition and their crystal structure, now known as Nickel-Strunz classification. It was first published in 1941. A major revision was published in 1966 together with Christel Tennyson. The 9th edition was published 2001 together with Ernest Henry Nickel.

Strunz was a founding member of the International Mineralogical Association, and was the head of the Mineral Data Commission between 1958 and 1970. He published over 200 scientific papers and multiple books, mostly about mineral classification and crystal chemistry.

He made many scientific expeditions to most of Europe's countries, Madagascar, Namibia, Zimbabwe and Tanzania.

He discovered 14 new minerals including chudobaite, fleischerite, hagendorfite, laueite, liandradite, petscheckite and stranskiite.

== Honors ==
In 1985 Strunz received the 'Bundesverdienstkreuz 1. Klasse' (Order of Merit of the Federal Republic of Germany, 1st class). He was an honorary member of over 20 national and international scientific organizations, a member of the German Academy of Sciences Leopoldina, and holder of the Emanuel Bořický medal, which is awarded by the Charles University in Prague.

The minerals strunzite, ferristrunzite, and ferrostrunzite are named after him.

== Selected publications ==
- Strunz, Karl Hugo (1937). "Zur Klassifikation der Silikate". Fortschritte der Mineralogie. 22.
- Strunz, Karl Hugo (1941). Mineralogische Tabellen. Becker und Erler. p. 295.
- Strunz, Karl Hugo (1948). "Zur Klassifizierung der Mineralien auf kristallchemischer Grundlage". Fortschritte der Mineralogie. 27: 32.
- Strunz, Hugo; Nickel, Ernest H. (2001). Strunz mineralogical tables : chemical-structural mineral classification system (9. ed.). Stuttgart: Schweizerbart. ISBN 978-3-510-65188-7.
