= British Institutions Reflection Profiling Syndicate =

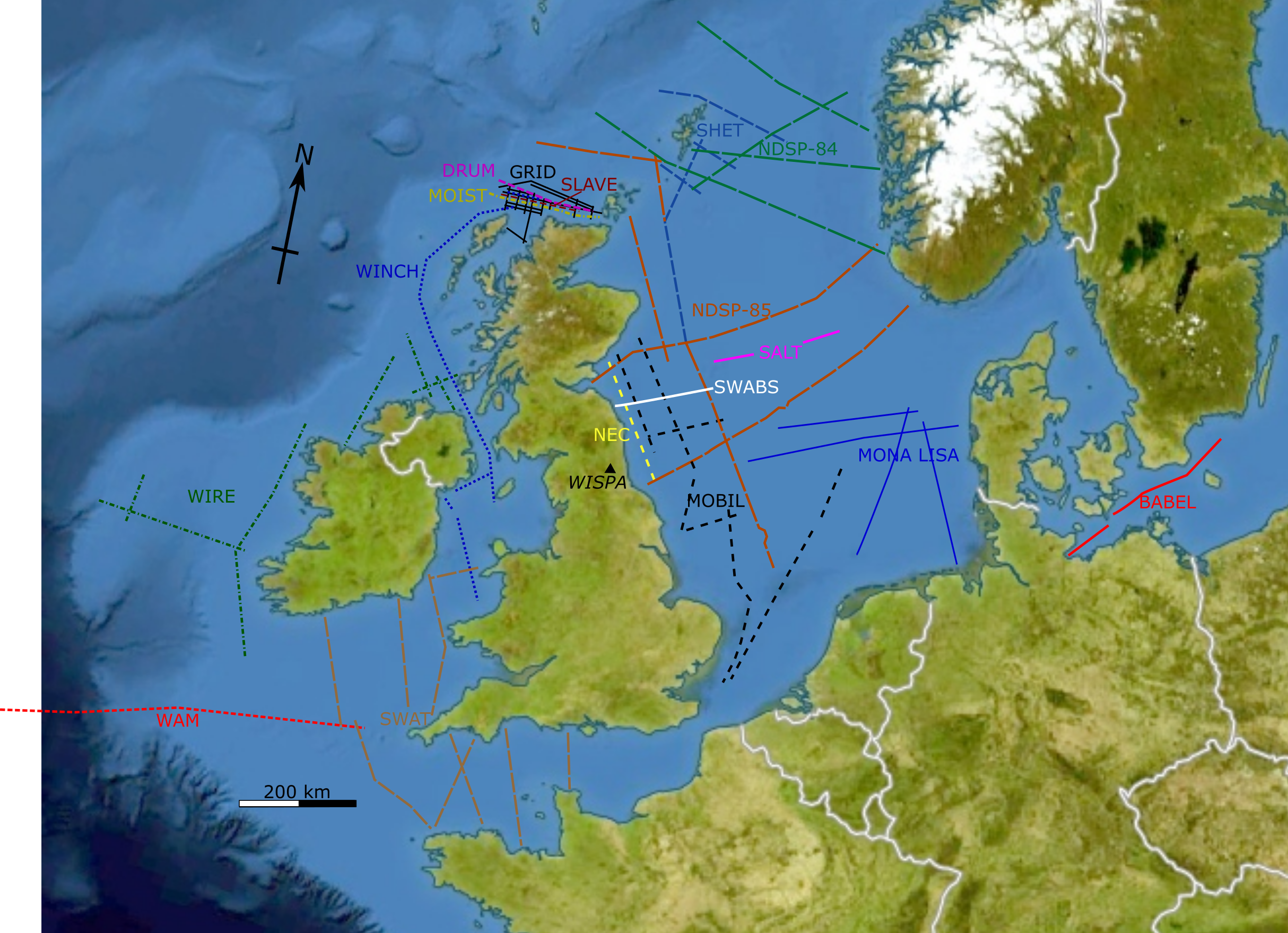
Location of most of the seismic profiles acquired by the BIRPS group

The British Institutions Reflection Profiling Syndicate, better known by its acronym BIRPS, was set up to acquire deep seismic reflection profiles around the United Kingdom Continental Shelf (UKCS). It was formed, initially as BURPS, the British Universities Reflection Profiling Syndicate, involving geophysicists from the Natural Environment Research Council (NERC) and British Universities. After the involvement of other institutions the name was changed to BIRPS and by February 1981 NERC had approved funding for a four-year programme. The next ten years saw the collection of 12,000 km of deep seismic profiles around the British Isles. By the time NERC stopped funding the program in 1997, more than 20,000 km of data had been acquired.

== Formation ==
In the mid 1970s, the technique of seismic reflection profiling, which had become a standard exploration tool in the oil and gas industry, was first applied to investigate the structure of the Earth's crust. The Consortium for Continental Reflection Profiling (COCORP) was set up in the US and from 1975 began acquiring data. The success of this approach in addressing the problems of deep crustal geometry across structures such as the Appalachians, led the Royal Society to set up a working group to investigate how a similar approach could be used in the United Kingdom. Drummond (Drum) Matthews and Derek Blundell were tasked with formulating a deep profiling program for the United Kingdom by the British Universities Reflection Profiling Syndicate (BURPS). After initially considering onshore profiles similar to those acquired by COCORP, the group were persuaded of the benefits of data acquisition offshore. An initial four-year program was approved in February 1981 by NERC and the group was officially inaugurated in November 1981 as the British Institutions Reflection Profiling Syndicate (BIRPS).

== Surveys ==
=== MOIST ===
==== Acquisition ====
The first profile to be acquired was the Moine and Outer Isle Seismic Traverse (MOIST). This roughly 185 km long line ran west–east, north of the Scottish mainland, intending to image the main Caledonian structures known onshore, such as the Outer Isles Fault Zone and the Moine Thrust Belt. The line was acquired in March 1981 by Western Geophysical and processing was complete by October of that year. It used a 3,000 m hydrophone streamer, with a 905 cu in (14.83 L) airgun array as its source. The record length was 15 seconds two-way travel time (TWTT).

==== Interpretation ====
The MOIST profile shows a series of deep half-graben basins, bounded to the west by easterly dipping extensional faults, part of the West Orkney Basin. The faults coincide with major east-dipping zones of reflectivity extending down to the lower crust. These have been interpreted to be Caledonian thrust structures, with the Outer Isles Fault clearly imaged. No direct correlation was possible between the Moine Thrust Belt onshore and the offshore structure. The MOIST line was also interpreted to show whole lithosphere extensional faulting, although later interpretation suggested that the major normal faults did not pass through the Moho.

The lower crust is observed to be quite reflective and bounded at its base by a clear reflection Moho event. Towards the western end of the line, east-dipping reflections are seen extending well into the mantle, the first time that undoubted mantle reflectivity had been imaged. This mantle structure was named the Flannan Thrust.

=== WINCH ===
==== Acquisition ====
The Western Isles-North Channel (WINCH) profiles were shot partly within the foreland of the Caledonian orogenic belt and partly across the Great Glen Fault. WINCH1 was a short west–east profile about 12 km north of the western end of the MOIST line. WINCH2 started just south of the eastern end of WINCH 1 continuing just north and west of the Outer Hebrides before running in a southeasterly direction down the North Channel, finishing just west of the Isle of Man. The data were acquired by the Geophysical Company of Norway (Geco), recorded using a 3,000 m streamer and a 4,795 cu in (78.58 L) capacity airgun array as its source. The data have a record length of 15 seconds TWTT, matching the earlier MOIST profile.

=== SWAT ===
==== Acquisition ====
The South West Approaches Traverse (SWAT) consisted of a series of eleven profiles acquired between September and November 1983 by Seismic Profilers Ltd, with a total length of 1600 km. The profiles were shot across the North and South Celtic Sea Basins, the Western Approaches Basin and the Western and Eastern Channel Basins. Processing was carried out by Seismograph Services Ltd. (SSL).

=== SALT ===
Two short profiles, named for the Zechstein salt layer found over large parts of the North Sea that had caused problems with deep seismic penetration, were acquired to test the feasibility of deep profiling over the area in preparation for the much larger NSDP survey.

==== Acquisition ====
The two profiles, SALT 1 and SALT 2 were shot in 1983 along parts of a previously acquired seismic refraction profile.

==== Interpretation ====
When this survey was shot, sufficient deep reflection data had been acquired to establish a pattern of reflectivity for the crust of the North Sea, with the Moho interpreted at the base of a band of reflections. The SALT survey showed that this was consistent with the Moho interpreted from earlier seismic refraction data.

=== DRUM ===
==== Acquisition ====
The DRUM profile was named as an acronym for Deep Reflections in the Upper Mantle and for Drummond (Drum) Matthews the BIRPS scientific director. It was acquired and processed in 1984 by GECO, with an unprecedented record length of 30 seconds TWTT.

==== Interpretation ====
The DRUM profile showed reflections down to the bottom of the record. The shallower part of the profile, down to the clearly imaged reflection Moho, is similar to that shown by the MOIST profile about 15 km further to the south. A series of east-dipping extensional faults are imaged in the upper part of the crust, with large half-graben basins in their hanging-walls. These fault flatten out at mid-crustal level and the lower crust is highly reflective. At the western end of the profile the Outer Isles Fault is clearly imaged. The Flannan Thrust can be traced down dip to the east, reaching at least to a depth of 75 km. Further reflections within the mantle included a very strong low-angle reflector, known as the W–reflector, at about 45–50 km depth extending over the eastern part of the profile, matching both the strength and continuity of the shallower Moho event. This flat event is not seen on the MOIST profile, suggesting that there may be significant out-of-plane dip on this reflector.

=== NSDP ===
The NSDP (North Sea Deep Profile) set of ten seismic profiles were shot to investigate the deep structure of the North Sea.

==== Acquisition ====
The NSDP profiles were acquired in 1984 and 1985 by Geco as a group shoot, involving the oil industry and BIRPS. The first five were shot in the Northern North Sea in 1984 and are named NSDP 84–1,2,3,4 and 5. The second set of profiles were shot in the central and southern North Sea in 1985 and are named NSDP 85–6, 7, 8, 9 and 10. The total line length for the survey is about 3,000 km. The record length for the survey was 15 seconds of two-way travel time. The data were initially processed by Geco as an unmigrated stack and the data were reprocessed by BIRPS.

=== GRID and SLAVE ===
==== Acquisition ====
The GRID profiles were acquired to provide a better coverage of structures already identified off the north coast of Scotland by MOIST, WINCH and DRUM. The SLAVE (Synthetic Large Aperture Velocity Experiment) profile was a two-ship wide-aperture experiment that formed part of the overall grid of lines. The data was recorded to record lengths of between 15 and 60 seconds of two-way travel time (TWTT).

==== Interpretation ====
This set of profiles followed up on the MOIST, DRUM and WINCH1 and WINCH2 profiles, forming an overall grid pattern, allowing the extent and orientation of the deeper reflections previously imaged to be investigated. The Flannan Thrust was shown to be continuous over almost the whole dataset. Its orientation matches that of known Caledonian structures, such as the Outer Isles Fault and Moine Thrust Zone, although this trend is also similar to structures of both Proterozoic and post-Caledonian age. The W-reflector was confirmed to be sub-horizontal in orientation, but of limited lateral extent.

=== SHET ===
The SHET survey consisted of four profiles, totalling 830 km, acquired around the Shetland Islands in August 1984.

==== Acquisition ====
The SHET profiles were shot by Geco to a record length of 15 seconds TWTT. The data were also processed by Geco using similar processing parameters to those used on earlier BIRPS profiles.

==== Interpretation ====
The most important observation from the SHET survey was that the Moho was apparently offset by the Walls Boundary Fault, a major strike-slip fault formed during the later part of the Caledonian Orogeny, thought to be part of the Great Glen Fault system.

=== NEC ===
==== Acquisition ====
The 237 km long North East Coast (NEC) profile was shot in October 1985 by Geco, with processing carried out by SSL. It ran from near Montrose in Scotland to near Hartlepool in England. The record length varied between 15 and 16 seconds TWTT, imaging down to an estimated 50 km. It was designed to provide information on the collision zone between the microcontinent of Avalonia and Laurentia, particularly the location and geometry of the Iapetus Suture.

=== WAM ===
The WAM (Western Approaches Margin) profile was shot in 1985 to investigate the structure of part of the UK continental margin.

=== WIRE ===
The WIRE (West of IREland) profiles were shot in 1987.

=== MOBIL ===
The MOBIL (Measurements Over Basins Imaging the Lithosphere) dataset was acquired after a gift of shiptime on the Mobil Search seismic vessel in 1987.

=== WISPA ===
The WISPA (Wearside Integrated S-wave and P-wave Analysis) experiment was acquired in 1988. This was the only entirely onshore seismic experiment carried out by the BIRPS group.

=== BABEL ===
The BABEL (Baltic and Bothnian Echoes from the Lithosphere) profiles were acquired in 1989 by a consortium of scientific institutions from Sweden, Denmark, Finland, Germany and the United Kingdom (the BIRPS group).

=== SWABS ===
The SWABS (Seismic Wide-Angle and Broadband Survey) was a two-ship seismic experiment shot in 1992 in the North Sea.

=== TIMOR & DAMAR ===
The TIMOR and DAMAR surveys were shot in 1992 across the Banda Arc.

==== Acquisition ====
These lines were shot by Geco using the M/V GECO-Kappa with a 4.6 km long hydrophone streamer and a 120-litre airgun array as its source. The shot intervals varied between the surveys with both 50 m and 100 m being used. The TIMOR profile was recorded to 23 seconds TWTT, while the DAMAR profile, which had a deeper target, was recorded to 35 seconds TWTT.

=== MONA LISA ===
The MONA LISA (Marine and Onshore North Sea Acquisition for Lithospheric Seismic Analysis) were a set of four normal incidence seismic reflection profiles and associated wide-angle data shot in 1993.

=== CHIX ===
The CHIX survey was a set of three profiles shot in 1996 across the Chicxulub crater.

==== Acquisition ====
The profiles were shot using the Geco Sigma vessel to a record length of 18 seconds two-way time with a total length of nearly 650 km. Chix-A was shot parallel to the coast about 20 km offshore, while Chix-B and Chix-C were shot in a NW–SE and NNE–SSW direction respectively. In addition to the conventional seismic reflection recording, ocean bottom seismometers (OBS) were deployed offshore and conventional seismometers were located on the onshore extension of Chix-B and C and along the coast. These extra seismometers were used to obtain information about the velocity structure. Offshore recording used a dual configuration streamer, set up to provide higher resolution in the upper crust and lower resolution of the whole crust. These two data types were processed using different approaches.

==== Interpretation ====
The Chix survey provided confirmation of the multi-ring nature of the Chicxulub crater. An outer ring, with normal faulting dipping towards the crater centre, affecting the Mesozoic carbonate sequence occurs at a radial distance from the interpreted crater centre of about 90–100 km. Closer-spaced normal faulting extend inwards from the interpreted inner crater rim at a distance of about 65 km. All the normal faults are associated with strong reflections from the interpreted fault planes, possibly as the result of thick developments of pseudotachylite friction melt rock, as might be expected for such rapid faulting. This survey also confirmed the presence of a peak ring, the first identified on Earth, at about 40 km distance. Further analysis also identified an uplift of the Moho by 1–2 km above its regional level beneath the central part of the structure.

=== ARAD ===
The ARAD (Anatomy of a Ridge-Axis Discontinuity) experiment was a 3D seismic survey carried out by investigators at Scripps Institute of Oceanography and the University of Cambridge in 1997 with funding from the RIDGE program of the National Science Foundation, BIRPS and the NERC.
