= Peter C. Burns =

Canadian-American mineralogist

- Citizenship: Canadian-American
- Education: University of New Brunswick (B.Sc.); University of Western Ontario (M.Sc.); University of Manitoba (Ph.D.)
- Known for: Uranyl peroxide nanoclusters; Actinide solid-state chemistry; Crystal chemistry of minerals
- Awards: Peacock Medal (2016); Fellow of the AAAS (2024); Fellow of the Mineralogical Society of America
- Scientific career
- Fields: Mineralogy; Actinide chemistry; Solid-state chemistry; Crystallography
- Workplaces: University of Notre Dame; Argonne National Laboratory

Peter C. Burns is a Canadian-American mineralogist and chemist. He is the Dorini Family Professor of Energy Studies in the Department of Civil and Environmental Engineering and Earth Sciences at the University of Notre Dame, with a concurrent appointment in the Department of Chemistry & Biochemistry. Burns is known for his work on the crystal chemistry of minerals, actinide solid-state and coordination chemistry, and the development of novel uranyl peroxide nanoclusters. His research addresses both fundamental crystallographic questions and applied problems in the immobilization and long-term management of nuclear waste.

== Early life and education ==
Burns earned a B.Sc. (Honours) in Geology from the University of New Brunswick (1988), an M.Sc. in Geology from the University of Western Ontario (1990), and a Ph.D. in Geology from the University of Manitoba (1994). His doctoral research focused on crystallography and mineral structures. He subsequently held an NSERC postdoctoral fellowship at the University of Cambridge and later at the University of New Mexico.

== Academic career ==
After spending one year on the faculty of the University of Illinois Urbana-Champaign, Burns joined the University of Notre Dame faculty in 1997, where he has served as department chair and held several named professorships, including the Henry J. Massman Chair before being appointed the Dorini Family Professor of Energy Studies. He directed the Center for Sustainable Energy at Notre Dame (ND Energy), a multidisciplinary initiative on energy research. He has also directed the Actinide Center of Excellence as well as the Energy Frontier Research Center Materials Science of Actinides, and served as a principal investigator for research funded by the U.S. Department of Energy.

Burns has held a special-term appointment in the Chemistry Division at Argonne National Laboratory and has collaborated extensively with U.S. national laboratories on nuclear energy and actinide chemistry projects.

== Research ==
Burns’ research integrates mineralogy, solid-state chemistry, and environmental geochemistry, with a focus on uranium and transuranium elements. He has characterized numerous uranyl mineral structures and has contributed to understanding how these minerals form and persist in natural and engineered environments.

A major strand of his work concerns the synthesis and study of nanoscale uranyl peroxide clusters, including large cage-like molecular assemblies that provide insight into uranium solution chemistry and possible analogues for nuclear fuel corrosion products. These clusters have also been studied for their stability, transformations, and potential applications in nuclear materials science.

His group has reported new structural types of neptunium and uranium oxides and phosphates, and he has published widely cited reviews on actinide solid-state and coordination chemistry.

== Service ==
Burns has served on the editorial boards of journals including American Mineralogist and Canadian Mineralogist. He has also been active in professional societies such as the Mineralogical Association of Canada and the Mineralogical Society of America, for which he has organized symposia and contributed review articles. He is a past president of both the Mineralogical Association of Canada and the International Mineralogical Association.

== Awards and honours ==
- Peacock Medal, Mineralogical Association of Canada (2016).
- Fellow of the American Association for the Advancement of Science (AAAS), 2024.
- Fellow of the Mineralogical Society of America.

== Selected publications ==
- Burns, Peter C.; Nyman, May (2018). "Captivation with encapsulation: a dozen years of exploring uranyl peroxide capsules". Dalton Trans. 47 (17): 5916–5927. doi:10.1039/C7DT04245K.
- Burns, Peter C.; Hughes, Karrie-Ann (2003). "Studtite, [(UO2)(O2)(H2O)2](H2O)2: the first structure of a peroxide mineral". American Mineralogist. 88 (7): 1165–1168. doi:10.2138/am-2003-0725.
- Forbes, Tori Z.; Burns, Peter C.; Skanthakumar, S.; Soderholm, L. (2007). "Synthesis, structure, and magnetism of Np2O5". Journal of the American Chemical Society. 129 (10): 2760–2761. doi:10.1021/ja069250r.
- Ling, J.; Ozga, M.; Stoffer, M.; Burns, P. C. (2012). "Uranyl-peroxide pyrophosphate cage clusters with oxalate and nitrate bridges". Dalton Trans. 41: 7278–7286. doi:10.1039/C2DT30229B.
- Gaster, C.B.; Felton, D.E.; Sweet, T.F.M.; Barth, B.S.; Oliver, A.G.; Latuda, A.J.; Rogers, J.M.; Burns, P.C. (2025). "Ionic-liquid-based synthesis of U24 uranyl peroxide cage clusters with encapsulated hexanuclear lanthanide oxide/hydroxide clusters". Inorganic Chemistry.
- Hazen, R.M.; Burns, P.C.; Cleaves, H.J. II; Downs, R.T.; Krivovichev, S.V.; Wong, M.L. (2024). "Molecular assembly indices of minerals: Some mineral structures are as complex as large biomolecules". Journal of the Royal Society Interface 21: 20230632.
- Burns, P.C.; Ewing, R.C.; Navrotsky, A. (2012). "Nuclear fuel after a reactor accident". Science 335: 1184–1188.
- Burns, P.C.; Hughes Kubatko, K.-A.; Sigmon, G.; Fryer, B.J.; Gagnon, J.E.; Antonio, M.R.; Soderholm, L. (2005). "Actinyl peroxide nanospheres". Angewandte Chemie International Edition 44: 2135–2139.
- Lussier, A.J.; King-Lopez, R.; Burns, P.C. (2016). "A revised and expanded structure hierarchy of natural and synthetic hexavalent uranium compounds". Canadian Mineralogist 54: 177–283.
