= Walter C. Pitman III =

American geophysicist (1931–2019)

Walter Clarkson Pitman III (21 October 1931 – 1 October 2019) was an American geophysicist and a professor emeritus at Columbia University. His measurements of magnetic anomalies on the ocean floor supported the Morley–Vine–Matthews hypothesis explaining seafloor spreading. With William Ryan, he developed the Black Sea deluge theory. Among his major awards are the Alexander Agassiz Medal and the Vetlesen Prize.

== Early life ==
Pitman was born on 21 October 1931 in Newark, New Jersey. He received a Bachelor of Science in electrical engineering in 1956 from Lehigh University and went to work for Hazeltine Corporation from 1956 to 1960. In 1960, he became a marine technician for Columbia University's Lamont–Doherty Earth Observatory, applying his expertise as an electrical engineer in oceanographic research. The following year he became a graduate student in geophysics. Among his most important work was measurements of magnetic anomalies in the sea floor which supported the Morley–Vine–Matthews hypothesis explaining seafloor spreading.

== Black Sea deluge theory ==
Pitman, along with Columbia colleague Bill Ryan, published evidence in 1997 that a massive flooding event greatly expanded the Black Sea very quickly around 5600 BC. This was published as Noah's Flood: The New Scientific Discoveries about the Event that Changed History in 1998, in which the authors argued that the deluge could be linked to mythical flood events such as Noah's Flood.

== Awards ==
In 1984, Pitman was awarded the Society for Sedimentary Geology’s Francis Shepard Medal. In 1996, he was awarded the Maurice Ewing Medal by the American Geophysical Union. In 1998, he received the Alexander Agassiz Medal of the United States National Academy of Sciences "for his fundamental contribution to the plate tectonic revolution through insightful analysis of marine magnetic anomalies and for his studies of the causes and effects of sea-level changes". In 2000, he was awarded the Vetlesen Prize for plate tectonic theory, theoretical geomorphology and tectonics. In 2013, he was elected fellow of the American Association for the Advancement of Science. He is also a Fellow of the American Geophysical Union and the Geological Society of America.

== Publications ==
- Ryan, William; Walter Pitman (1997). Noah's Flood: The New Scientific Discoveries About The Event That Changed History. Simon & Schuster. ISBN 978-0-684-85920-0.
