= Cuprospinel =

Copper iron mixed oxide mineral

General
- Category: Oxide mineral Spinel group
- Formula: CuFe_{2}O_{4} or (Cu,Mg)Fe_{2}O_{4}
- Strunz classification: 4.BB.05
- Crystal system: Isometric
- Crystal class: Hexoctahedral (m3̅m); H-M symbol: (4/m 3 2/m)
- Space group: Cubic; Space group: Fd3̅m

Identification
- Formula mass: 239.23 g/mol
- Color: Black, gray in reflected light
- Crystal habit: Irregular grains, laminae intergrown with hematite
- Mohs scale hardness: 6.5
- Luster: Metallic
- Streak: Black
- Diaphaneity: Opaque
- Specific gravity: 5 - 5.2
- Optical properties: Isotropic
- Refractive index: n = 1.8

Cuprospinel
Names
- IUPAC name Copper(2+) bis[oxido(oxo)iron
- Other names: Copper iron oxide; Cuprospinel; Copper diiron tetraoxide; Copper ferrite

Identifiers
CAS Number	37220-43-2
3D model (JSmol)	Interactive image
ChemSpider	17345280
PubChem CID	16217788
CompTox Dashboard (EPA)	DTXSID60190714
- InChI: Key: DXKGMXNZSJMWAF-UHFFFAOYSA-N; InChI=1S/Cu.2Fe.4O/q+2;;;;;2*-1
- SMILES: O=[Fe][O-].O=[Fe][O-].[Cu+2]
- Except where otherwise noted, data are given for materials in their standard state (at 25 °C [77 °F], 100 kPa). (what is ?) Infobox references

Cuprospinel is a mineral. Cuprospinel is an inverse spinel with the chemical formula CuFe_{2}O_{4}, where copper substitutes some of the iron cations in the structure. Its structure is similar to that of magnetite, Fe_{3}O_{4}, yet with slightly different chemical and physical properties due to the presence of copper.

The type locality of cuprospinel is Baie Verte, Newfoundland, Canada, where the mineral was found in an exposed ore dump. The mineral was first characterized by Ernest Henry Nickel, a mineralogist with the Department of Energy, Mines and Resources in Australia, in 1973. Cuprospinel is also found in other places, for example, in Hubei province, China and at Tolbachik volcano in Kamchatka, Russia.

== Properties ==
=== Structural ===
Cuprospinel, like many other spinels has the general formula AB_{2}O_{4}. Yet, cuprospinel is an inverse spinel in that its A element, in this case copper (Cu^{2+}), only occupies octahedral sites in the structure and the B element, iron (Fe^{2+} and Fe^{3+}), is split between the octahedral and tetrahedral sites in the structure. The Fe^{2+} species will occupy some of the octahedral sites and there will only be Fe^{3+} at the tetrahedral sites. Cuprospinel adopts both cubic and tetragonal phases at room temperature, yet as temperature is elevated the cubic form is most stable.

=== Magnetic ===
CuFe_{2}O_{4} nanoparticles have been characterized as a superparamagnetic material with saturated magnetization of Ms = 49 emu g^{−1}, remanent magnetization (M_{r} = 11.66 emu g^{−1}) and coercivity (H_{c} = 63.1 mT). The magnetic properties of CuFe_{2}O_{4} are correlated with the size of particles. Particularly, the decreasing in saturated magnetization and remanence correspond to the decreasing in the size of CuFe_{2}O_{4} particles, whereas the coercivity increases.

== Synthesis ==
=== Solid phase ===
Spinel CuFe_{2}O_{4} can be synthesized by solid phase synthesis at high temperature. In a particular procedure for this type of synthesis, the stoichiometric mixture of Cu(CH_{3}COO)_{2}· and FeC_{2}O_{2} is ground together and stirred in a solvent. After evaporation of the solvent, the resulting powder is heated in a furnace at constant temperature around 900 °C (1,650 °F) in normal air-atmosphere environment. Then the resulting product is slowly cooled to room temperature in order to obtain the desired stable spinel structure.

=== Hydrothermal treatment of a precipitate in TEG ===
A method combining a first precipitation step at room temperature in triethylene glycol (TEG), a viscous and highly hygroscopic liquid with an elevated boiling point, 285 °C (545 °F; 558 K), followed by a thermal treatment at elevated temperature is an effective way to synthesize spinel oxide, especially copper iron oxide. Typically, NaOH is first added dropwise to a solution of Fe^{3+} (Fe(NO_{3})_{3} or Fe(acac)_{3}) and Cu^{2+} (Cu(NO_{3})_{2} or CuCl_{2}) in triethylene glycol at room temperature with constant stirring until a reddish-black precipitate completely form. The resulting viscous suspension is then placed in an ultrasonic bath to be properly dispersed, followed by heating in a furnace at high temperature. The final product is then washed in diethyl ether, ethyl acetate, ethanol and deionized water, and then dried under vacuum to obtain oxide particles.

== Uses ==
Cuprospinel is used in various industrial processes as a catalyst. An example is the water–gas shift reaction:

H_{2}O_{(v)} + CO_{(g)} → CO_{2(g)} + H_{2(g)}

This reaction is particularly important for hydrogen production and enrichment.

The interest of cuprospinel arises in that magnetite is a widely used catalyst for many industrial chemical reactions, such as the Fischer–Tropsch process, the Haber–Bosch process and the water-gas shift reaction. It has been shown that doping magnetite with other elements gives it different chemical and physical properties; these different properties sometimes allow the catalyst to work more efficiently. As such, cuprospinel is essentially magnetite doped with copper and this enhances magnetite's water gas shift properties as a heterogeneous catalyst.

=== Recyclable catalyst for organic reactions ===
Recent years, various research towards the heterogeneous catalytic ability of CuFe_{2}O_{4} in organic synthesis have been published ranging from traditional reactions to modern organometallic transformation. By taking advantages of magnetic nature, the catalyst can be separated simply by external magnetism, which can overcome the difficulty to separate nano-scaled metal catalyst from the reaction mixture. Particularly, only by applying magnetic bar at the outer vessel, the catalyst can easily be held at the edge of container while removing solution and washing particles. The obtained particles can be readily used for the next catalyst cycles. Moreover, the catalytic site can be exploited in either cooper or iron center because of the large-surface area of nanoparticles, leading to wide scope to apply this material in various types of reactions.

==== Catalyst for multi-component reaction (MCR) ====
Nano CuFe_{2}O_{4} can be utilized as a catalyst in a one-pot synthesis of fluorine containing spirohexahydropyrimidine derivatives. It has also been observed that the catalyst can be reused five times without significant loss in catalytic activity after each runs. In the reaction, iron plays a vital role in the coordination with the carbonyl group in order to increase the electrophilic property, which can facilitate the reaction conditions and increase the reaction rate.

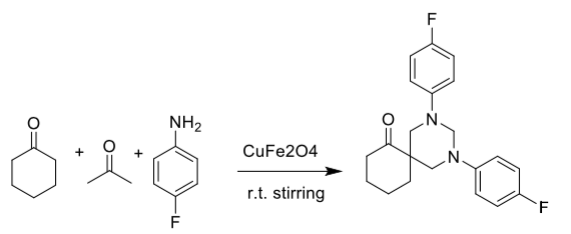
One-pot synthesis of fluorine containing spirohexahydropyrimidine derivatives. Adapted from Dandia, Jain & Sharma 2013.

Another example for MCR utilizing CuFe_{2}O_{4} was published in a research towards the A3 coupling of aldehydes, amine with phenylacetylene to give the corresponding propargylamines. The catalyst can be reused three times without remarkable reduce in reaction yield.

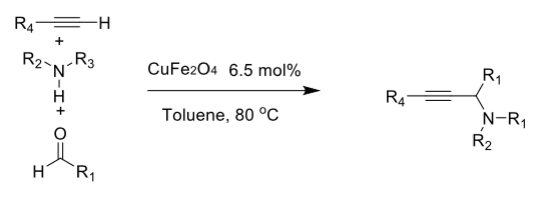
A3 coupling of aldehydes, amine with phenylacetylene. Adapted from Tamaddon & Amirpoor 2013.

==== Catalyst for C-O cross coupling ====
Pallapothula and coworkers demonstrated CuFe_{2}O_{4} is an efficient catalyst for C-O cross-coupling between phenols and aryl halides. The catalyst exhibited superior activity in comparison with other nanoparticles oxides such as Co_{3}O_{4}, SnO_{2}, Sb_{2}O_{3}. Moreover, the catalyst can benefit in applying C-O cross-coupling on alkyl alcohols, leading to widening scope for the transformation.

C-O cross-coupling between phenols and aryl halides. Adapted from Yang et al. 2013.

==== Catalyst for C-H activation ====
Nano CuFe_{2}O_{4} catalyst was demonstrated its activity for C-H activation in Mannich type reaction. In the mechanistic study, the copper play a significant role in both generate radical from TBHP and activate C-H from substituted alkyne. In this reaction, iron center was considered as a magnetic source and this hypothesis was proved by the experiment, in which magnetic Fe_{3}O_{4} had been used but failed to catalyze reaction in the absence of copper center.

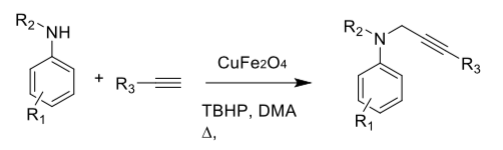
C-H activation in Mannich type reaction. Adapted from Nguyen et al. 2014.

==== Other reactions ====
CuFe_{2}O_{4} can also be applied for C-C cleavage α-arylation between acetylacetone with iodobenzene. The phenylacetone product was obtained with excellent yield at 99% and 95% selectivity observed for principal product compared to 3-phenyl-2,4-pentanedione as the byproduct. The XRD results were observed that crystal structure of catalyst remained unchanged after the sixth run while catalytic activity slightly decreases at 97% conversion in the final run. In this reaction, the mechanistic study showed the catalytic cycle started from Cu^{II} to Cu^{I} and then oxidized to Cu^{II} by aryl iodine.

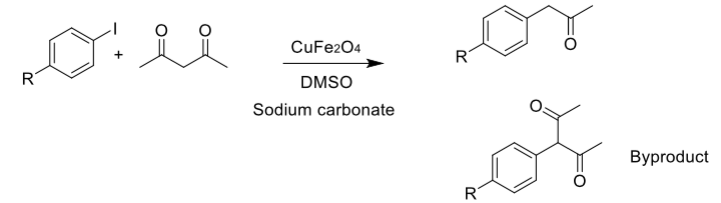
Arylation between acetylacetone with iodobenzene. Adapted from Nguyen et al. 2014.

The role of copper has been further emphasized in the coupling reaction of ortho-arylated phenols and dialkylformamides. It was observed that there was a single-electron oxidative addition of copper^{II} to copper^{III} through a radical step, then transformed back to copperI by reductive elimination in the presence of either oxygen or peroxide. Catalyst can be reused 9 times without significant loss in catalytic activities.

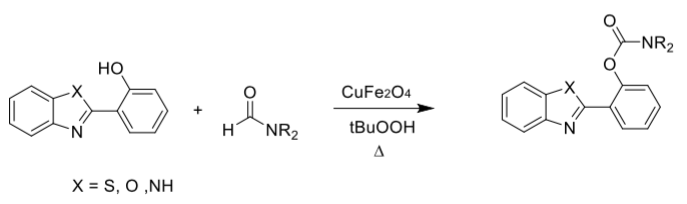
Coupling reaction of ortho-arylated phenols and dialkylformamides. Adapted from Nguyen et al. 2017.

==== Synergistic effect of catalytic activity ====
Notably, synergistic effect was demonstrated for the case of CuFe_{2}O_{4} in Sonogashira reaction. Both Fe and Cu center contribute to catalytic activity of the transformation between aryl halide and substituted alkynes. The product was obtained with 70% yield in the presence of Nano CuFe_{2}O_{4}, while only 25% yield and <1% yield observed when using CuO and Fe_{3}O_{4} respectively.

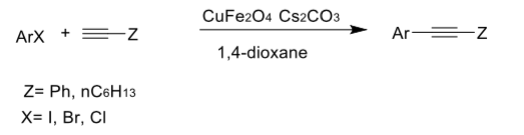
Transformation between aryl halide and substituted alkynes

==== Mechanism of action of the catalyst ====
As can be noted in the examples shown above, many molecules involved in the reactions catalyzed by CuFe_{2}O_{4} have a carbonyl group (C=O) or amine group (-NH_{2}), which have electron lone pairs. These lone pairs are used to be adsorbed at the surface of the empty 3d orbital in the catalyst, and thus activate the molecules for the intended reactions. Other molecules containing functional groups with electron lone pairs such as nitro (NO_{2}) and thiol (RS-H) also are activated by the catalyst. Species forming containing a single unpaired electron such as TEMPO or peroxymonosulphate are also adsorbed and activated to promote some organic reactions.
