= Ernest Henry Nickel =

Australian-Canadian mineralogist, CSIRO-Exploration & Mining

- Born: August 31, 1925; Louth, Ontario
- Died: July 18, 2009 (aged 83)
- Education: University of Chicago
- Known for: Nickel-Strunz classification

Ernest (Ernie) Henry Nickel (born Ernst Heinrich Nickel on 31 August 1925 in Louth, Ontario, died on 18 July 2009) was a mineralogist from Canada who emigrated to Australia. He is best known as an editor of the ninth edition of the Nickel-Strunz classification together with Karl Hugo Strunz.

== Education ==
Nickel received his B.Sc. in 1950 and his M.Sc. in 1951 from McMaster University in Hamilton. For his PhD he attended the University of Chicago, from which he graduated in 1953.

== Work ==
Following his studies he worked for the Canadian Department of Mines and Technical Surveys (CANMET). In 1971 he moved to Australia to work for the Commonwealth Scientific and Industrial Research Organisation (CSIRO). He continued to work there even after retiring in 1985.

He was the president of the Mineralogical Association of Canada from 1970 to 1971. He was Australian representative on the old Commission on New Minerals and Mineral Names (CNMMN/ IMA) since 1974, and he was CNMMN vice-chairman on the side of the Canadian chairman Joseph (Joe) A. Mandarino (1983-1994). He created the 'Mineral database' together with Monte C. Nichols, and published over 120 papers and books. Together with Dorian Smith he helped oversee the IMA Subcommittee on Unnamed Minerals, which listed the unnamed minerals in the literature, and increased the list of approved mineral species from less than 3,000 to over 4,000. He made 24 first descriptions of minerals including cuprospinel, niocalite, wodginite, carrboydite, nickelblödite, otwayite, nullaginite and kambaldaite.

Nickel received numerous honors for his work. The mineral ernienickelite (chalcophanite group) is named after him.

== Selected publications ==
- Nickel, Ernest H.; Nichols, Monte C. (1991). Mineral reference manual. New York: Van Nostrand Reinhold. ISBN 978-0442003449.
- Strunz, Hugo; Nickel, Ernest H. (2001). Strunz mineralogical tables: chemical-structural mineral classification system (9 ed.). Stuttgart: Schweizerbart. ISBN 978-3-510-65188-7.
