= Unterwössen =

- Municipality
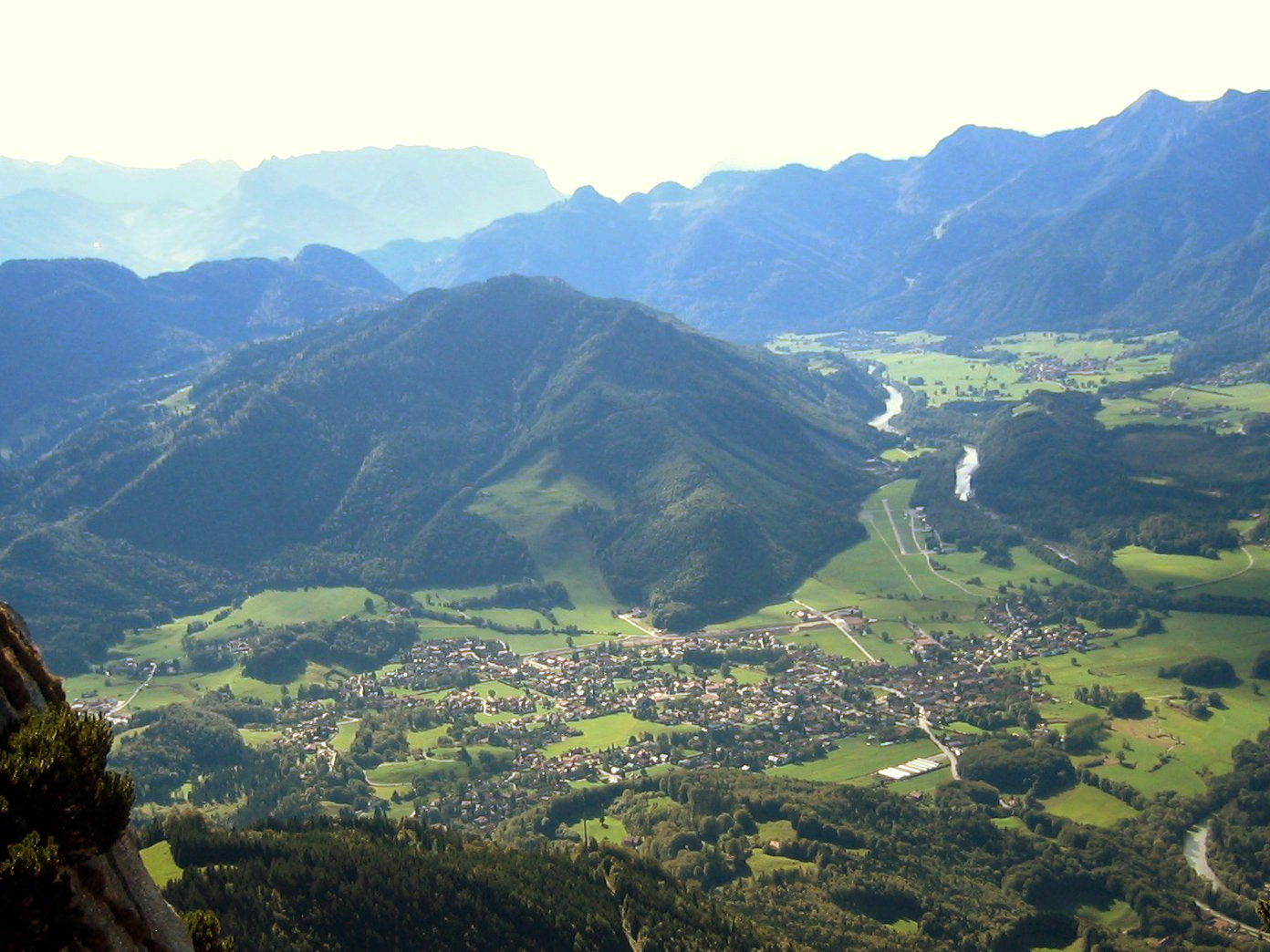
- Aerial view

- Coat of arms

- Location of Unterwössen within Traunstein district
- Interactive map of Unterwössen
- Location within Germany Location within Bavaria
- Coordinates: 47°44′N 12°28′E
- Country: Germany
- State: Bavaria
- Admin. region: Oberbayern
- District: Traunstein

Government
  - Mayor (2020–26): Ludwig Entfellner (CSU)

Area
  - Total: 41.28 km^{2} (15.94 sq mi)
- Elevation: 555 m (1,821 ft)

Population (2025-12-31)
  - Total: 3,622
  - Density: 87.74/km^{2} (227.3/sq mi)
- Time zone: UTC+01:00 (CET)
  - Summer (DST): UTC+02:00 (CEST)
- Postal codes: 83246
- Dialling codes: 0 86 41
- Vehicle registration: TS
- Website: www.unterwoessen.de

Unterwössen is a municipality in the district of Traunstein in Bavaria, Germany.
