= Strunzite =

Light yellow mineral of the strunzite group

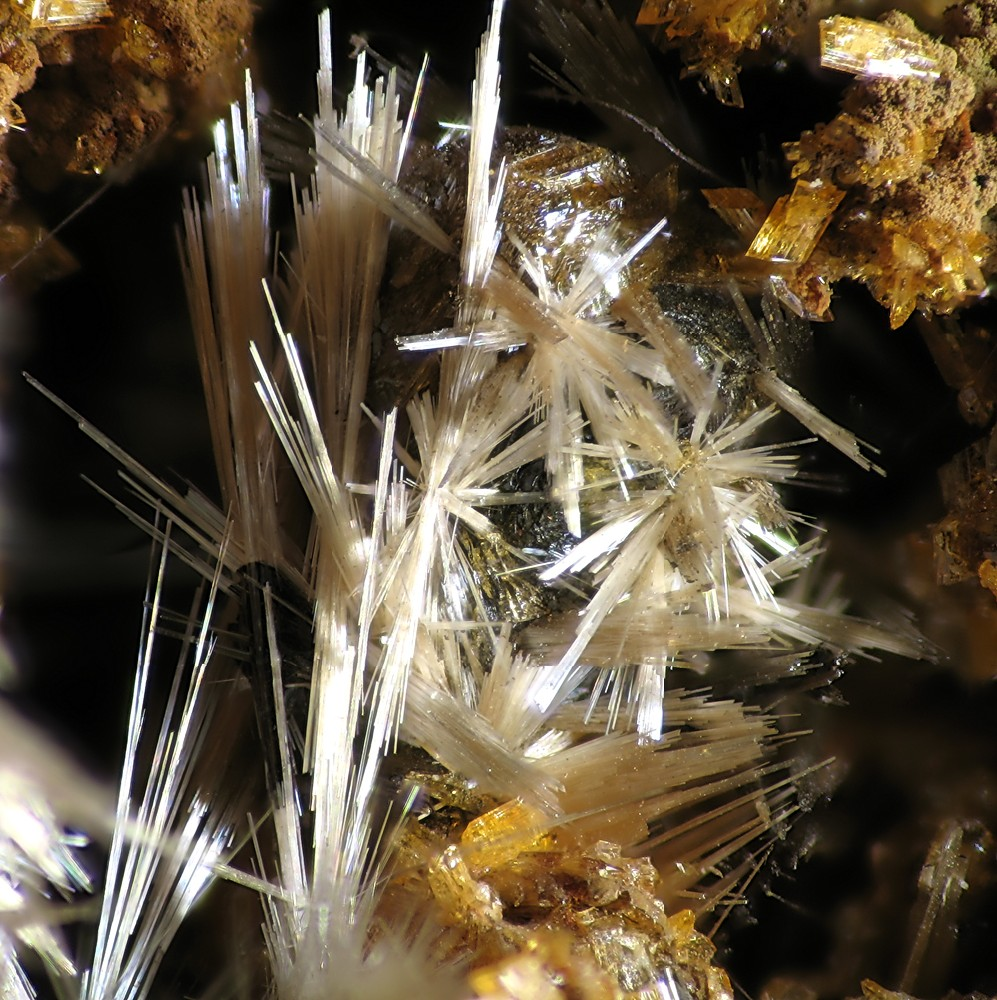
- Strunzite from Bavaria, Germany

General
- Category: Minerals
- Formula: Mn^{2+}Fe^{3+}_{2}(PO_{4})_{2}(OH)_{2} · 6H_{2}O
- IMA symbol: Snz
- Strunz classification: 8.DC.25
- Crystal system: Triclinic
- Space group: P1̅ (no. 2)
- Unit cell: a = 10.228(5) [Å], b = 9.837(5) [Å] c = 7.284(5) [Å]; α = 90.17(5)° β = 98.44(5)° γ = 117.44(5)°; Z = 2

Identification
- Color: Straw yellow to brownish yellow
- Crystal habit: Acicular
- Mohs scale hardness: 4
- Luster: vitreous
- Streak: white
- Specific gravity: 2.52
- Density: 2.52 g/cm^{3}
- Pleochroism: Weak

Strunzite (Mn^{2+}Fe^{3+}_{2}(PO_{4})_{2}(OH)_{2} · 6H_{2}O) is a light yellow mineral of the strunzite group, first discovered in 1957.

It crystallizes in the triclinic system and has a light, vitreous luster, a specific gravity of 2.52 and a Mohs hardness of 4. Associated minerals include beraunite, quartz and strengite.

It is named after Hugo Strunz, a Professor of Mineralogy at Technische Universität Berlin.
