= Frederick Vine =

English marine geologist (1939–2024)

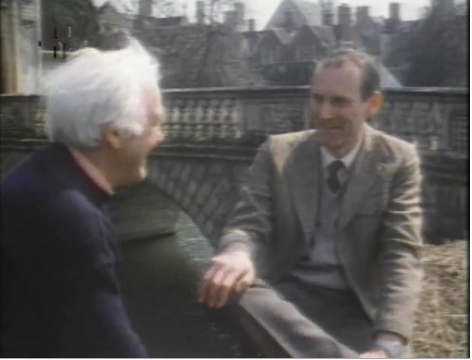
- Vine (right) and Drummond Matthews, 1981
- Born: 17 June 1939; Chiswick, London, England
- Died: 21 June 2024 (aged 85); Norwich, Norfolk, England
- Education: Latymer Upper School
- Alma mater: St John's College, Cambridge
- Spouse: Susan 'Sue' Vine (née McCall)
- Awards: Arthur L. Day Medal (1968); Bigsby Medal (1971); Chapman Medal (1973); FRS (1974); Appleton Medal and Prize (1977); Balzan Prize (1981); Hughes Medal (1982); Prestwich Medal (2007)
- Scientific career
- Fields: Marine Geologist; Geophysicist
- Workplaces: Princeton University; University of East Anglia
- Website: www.uea.ac.uk/environmental-sciences/people/profile/f-vine#overviewTab

Frederick John Vine FRS (17 June 1939 – 21 June 2024) was an English marine geologist and geophysicist. He made key contributions to the theory of plate tectonics, helping to show that the seafloor spreads from mid-ocean ridges with a symmetrical pattern of magnetic reversals in the basalt rocks on either side.

== Early life ==
Vine was born in Chiswick, London, and educated at Latymer Upper School and St John's College, Cambridge where he studied Natural Sciences (BA, 1962) and marine geophysics (PhD, 1965). He married Susan 'Sue' Vine (née McCall), who worked as a research assistant for Drummond Matthews in the Department of Geodesy and Geophysics, University of Cambridge, contributing to the development of the sea-floor spreading hypothesis associated with Matthews and her husband.

== Plate tectonics ==
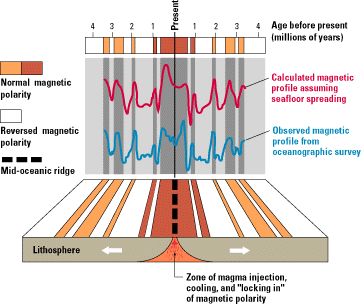
The observed magnetic profile for the sea floor around a mid-oceanic ridge agrees closely with the profile predicted by the Vine–Matthews–Morley hypothesis.

Vine's PhD thesis was on 'Magnetism in the Seafloor' and supervised by Drummond Matthews. Having met Harry Hess he was aware of sea floor spreading, where the ocean bed acts as a 'conveyor belt' moving away from the central ridge. Vine's work, with that of Drummond Matthews and Lawrence Morley of the Geological Survey of Canada, helped put the variations in the magnetic properties of the ocean crust into context in what is now known as the Vine–Matthews–Morley hypothesis. Specifically they supported Dietz's (Nature 1961) idea that sea floor spreading was occurring at mid-ocean ridges. Vine and Matthews showed that basalt created at a mid-ocean ridge records earth's current magnetic field polarity (and strength), thus turning Hess's theoretical 'conveyor belt' into a 'tape recorder'. Furthermore, they showed that magnetic reversals 'frozen' into these rocks, as suggested by Allan Cox (Nature 1963), can be seen as parallel strips as you travel perpendicularly away from the ridge crest.

== Academic career ==
Vine worked with E. M. Moores on the Ophiolite in the Troodos Mountains of southern Cyprus. He worked with R. A. Livermore and A. G. Smith on the history of the Earth's magnetic field. He worked on the electrical conductivity of rocks from the lower continental crust with R. G. Ross and P. W. J. Glover, which culminated in 1992 with measurements of the electrical conductivity of graphite-rich amphibolites and granulites at lower crustal temperatures and pressures with a full water saturation and pore fluid pressure and graphite-free

In 1967, Vine became assistant professor of geology and geophysics at Princeton University. In 1970 he moved to the School of Environmental Sciences at the University of East Anglia, becoming professor there in 1974. He served as dean from 1977 to 1980, and again from 1993 to 1998. After 1998, he was a professorial fellow of the University of East Anglia. and then in 2008 he became an emeritus professor there.

== Death ==
Vine died on 21 June 2024, at the age of 85.

== Honours ==
Vine's honours included:

- Day Medal in 1968
- Bigelow Medal of Woods Hole Oceanographic Institution in 1970
- Bigsby Medal of the Geological Society of London in 1971
- Chapman Medal of the Royal Astronomical Society (1973)
- Fellowship of the Royal Society in March 1974
- The Chree Medal and Prize of the Institute of Physics (1977)
- Hughes Medal of the Royal Society (1982)
- International Balzan Prize (1981)
- Prestwich Medal of the Geological Society of London in 2007

== Publications ==
- Vine, F. J. (2001). "Reversals of fortune". In Oreskes, N (ed.). An insider's history of the modern theory of the Earth. Boulder, Colorado: Westview Press. pp. 46–66.
- Glover, P.W.J.; Vine, F.J. (1992). "Electrical conductivity of carbon bearing granulite at raised temperatures and pressures". Nature. 360 (6406): 723–726. Bibcode:1992Natur.360..723G. doi:10.1038/360723a0. S2CID 4238126.
- Glover, P.W.J.; Vine, F.J. (1992). "Electrical conductivity of the continental crust". Geophys. Res. Lett. 21 (22): 2357–2360. Bibcode:1994GeoRL..21.2357G. doi:10.1029/94GL01015.
- Vine, F. J.; Matthews, D H (1963). "Magnetic anomalies over oceanic ridges". Nature. 199 (4897): 947–949. Bibcode:1963Natur.199..947V. doi:10.1038/199947a0. S2CID 4296143.
- Vine, F. J. (2003). "Ophiolites, ocean crust formation and magnetic studies: a personal view". In Dilek, Y.; Newcomb, S (eds.). Ophiolite concept and the evolution of geological thought. Geological Society of America Special Paper. Vol. 373. pp. 65–75.
- Kearey, Philip; Klepeis, Keith A.; Vine, Frederick J. (2009). Global tectonics (3 ed.). Wiley-Blackwell. p. 482. ISBN 978-1-4051-0777-8. First edition: 1990, second edition: 1996.

== See also ==
- List of geophysicists
