= Drummond Matthews =

British marine geologist and geophysicist

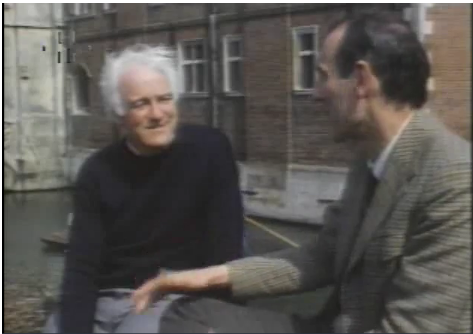
Drummond Matthews (left) and Frederick Vine, 1981

Drummond Hoyle Matthews FRS (5 February 1931 – 20 July 1997), known as "Drum", was a British marine geologist and geophysicist and a key contributor to the theory of plate tectonics. His work, along with that of fellow Briton Fred Vine and Canadian Lawrence Morley, showed how variations in the magnetic properties of rocks forming the ocean floor could be consistent with, and ultimately help confirm, Harry Hammond Hess's 1962 theory of seafloor spreading. In 1989 he was awarded the Geological Society of London's highest honour, the Wollaston Medal.

== Early life ==
During World War II he went to school at The Downs in Malvern, and then Bryanston School in Dorset. He became head boy at both.

== Career ==
Alfred Wegener's theory of continental drift had never gained much scientific support due to its lack of any satisfactory mechanism to drive the process. During the 1950s, however, extensive surveys of the ocean floor revealed a global, linked system of mid-ocean ridges, all of which exhibited high thermal flow and considerable seismic activity. Hess hypothesized that new ocean crust was being formed at the ocean ridges by extrusions of magma from the Earth's mantle, and that convection currents within the mantle were continuously carrying the newly formed crust away from the ridge, widening the ocean basin and pushing the continents apart.

In 1962 Matthews, as a research fellow at King's College, Cambridge, made a survey across part of an ocean ridge in the north-west Indian Ocean. This revealed a pattern of magnetic anomalies running in parallel stripes and virtually symmetrically on either side of the ridge. The most plausible explanation for these anomalies required the assumption (already in circulation at the time, but not yet proven) that the Earth's magnetic field had reversed its polarity repeatedly over time. Ocean crust consists of basic igneous rock, containing significant amounts of magnetite. When such rock solidifies, the magnetite aligns itself with the prevailing magnetic field at the time, thus providing a sort of "fossil" magnetic record. If new crust were being formed at the ridges and moving away, as Hess theorized, then reversals in the Earth's magnetic polarity would result in just the kind of parallel, symmetrical anomalies that Matthews' survey had found. The ocean crust would in effect act as a kind of giant tape recorder of magnetic anomalies over time.

Matthews and his research student, Fred Vine, published these ideas in the article "Magnetic Anomalies over Ocean Ridges" in the magazine Nature in 1963. From then on, rapid progress was made both in terms of acceptance of Hess's theory and of further verification. Subsequent surveys of other ocean ridges showed similar and correlatable anomalies in every case. Confirmation of the Earth's polarity reversals a few years later not only further validated the Vine–Matthews–Morley hypothesis but provided a timescale allowing the rate of spreading to be estimated for each section of ocean ridge. The contribution of Matthews and Vine proved to be an essential element in the development and acceptance of plate tectonics theory.

In 1977 he won the Chree medal and prize.

In 1982 Matthews became the first scientific director of the British Institutions Reflection Profiling Syndicate (BIRPS), which had been established in 1981 to carry out deep seismic reflection profiling around the United Kingdom Continental Shelf.
