= Lawrence Morley =

Canadian geophysicist (1920–2013)

- Born: Lawrence Whitaker Morley; February 19, 1920; Toronto, Ontario, Canada
- Died: April 22, 2013 (aged 93); Leith, Ontario, Canada
- Education: University of Toronto
- Known for: Founding the Canada Centre for Remote Sensing; Study of magnetic properties of ocean crust.
- Awards: Officer of the Order of Canada, 1999; McCurdy award, 1974
- Scientific career
- Fields: Geophysics

Lawrence Whitaker Morley (February 19, 1920 – April 22, 2013) was a Canadian geophysicist and remote sensing pioneer. He was best known for his studies on the magnetic properties of the oceanic crust and their effect on plate tectonics and for starting the remote sensing program in Canada.

== Biography ==
Morley worked on the theory of continental drift similar to work by Britons Fred Vine and Drummond Matthews. The three contributed significantly to geology by relating the magnetic properties of ocean crust to the processes involved in the theory of plate tectonics. Following graduate studies at the University of Toronto, Morley became Director of the Geophysics Branch of the Geological Survey of Canada in Ottawa (1950–1969). In 1970 he founded the Canada Centre for Remote Sensing and served as its Director General from 1971 to 1980.

In 1974, Morley received an honorary degree from York University. He approached the university's faculty of science in 1985 to promote the creation of an institute of space research, which was founded by himself in 1986 as the Institute for Space and Terrestrial Science (ISTS).

Morley served as a radar officer for the Royal Canadian Navy during the Battle of the Atlantic during the Second World War. He has published over 65 scientific and technical papers on mineral exploration and remote sensing.

Morely was the founding Chairman of the Canadian Remote Sensing Society in 1974. In 1986 he received first Gold Medal of the Canadian Remote Sensing Society. In 2013 the Gold Medal was renamed the Larry Morley Gold Medal in his honor. Morley was awarded a Gold Medal from the Royal Canadian Geographical Society in 1995 and in 2015 was inducted into the Canadian Science and Engineering Hall of Fame.

== See also ==
- Natural Resources Canada
- Geophysics
