= Luyendyk =

Luyendyk may refer to:

- Arie Luyendyk (born 1953), Dutch racing driver
- Arie Luyendyk Jr. (born 1981), son of the above and also a racing driver
  - Luyendyk Racing, racing team owned by Luyendyk Sr. for which Luyendyk Jr. raced in the 2006 Indianapolis 500
- Bruce P. Luyendyk (born 1943), American geophysicist
  - Mount Luyendyk, mountain in Antarctica named for the above
