= Thompson Ridge =

Ridge in Marie Byrd Land, Antarctica

Thompson Ridge (76°27′S 146°5′W) is a rock ridge, 2 nautical miles (3.7 km) long and trending north–south on the south shore of Block Bay, 2.1 nautical miles (3.5 km) northwest of Mount Luyendyk, Fosdick Mountains in Marie Byrd Land, Antarctica. It is composed wholly of Fosdick Metamorphic Rocks. These are determined to be of Cretaceous age.

The feature was photographed and mapped by the United States Antarctic Service (USAS), 1939–41, led by Byrd.

The naming was proposed by Admiral Byrd for Gershom J. Thompson, eminent doctor and professor at the Mayo Clinic, who advised on medical questions relating to the Byrd Antarctic Expeditions, 1928–30 and 1933–35, and made financial contributions to them.
