= Coast Guard Arctic Service Medal =

Award of the United States Coast Guard

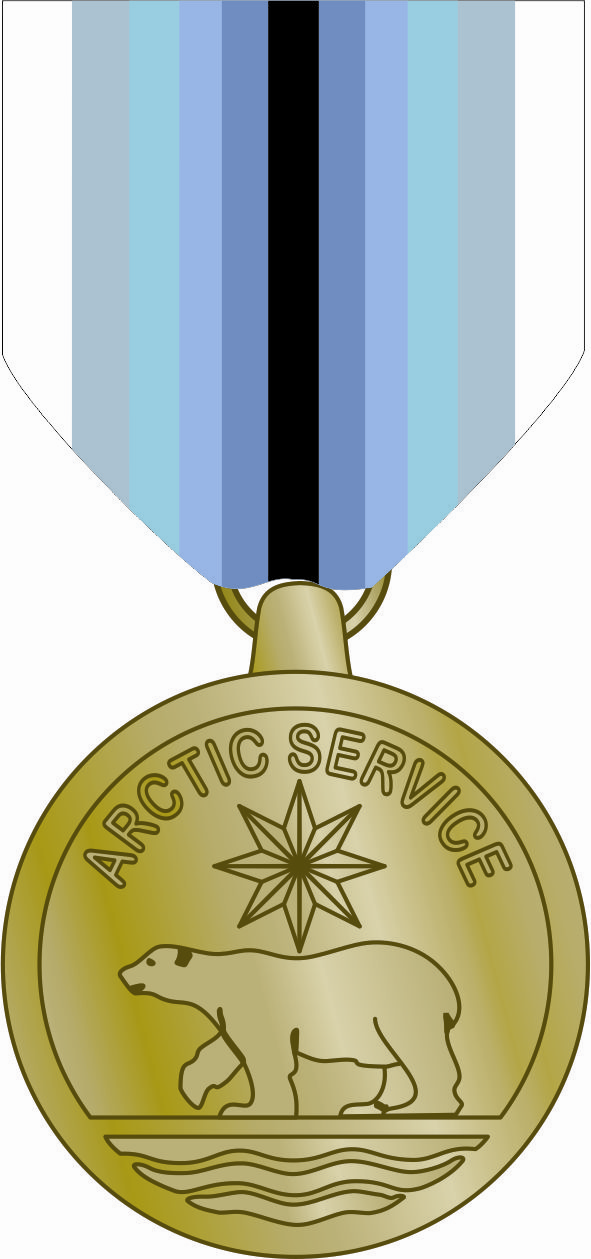
- Coast Guard Arctic Service Medal
- Type: Military medal Service medal
- Awarded for: Twenty-one days of non-consecutive duty afloat or ashore north of the Arctic Circle
- Presented by: the Department of Homeland Security
- Status: current
- Established: 20 May 1976
- ribbon

Precedence
- Next (higher): Antarctica Service Medal
- Next (lower): Armed Forces Expeditionary Medal

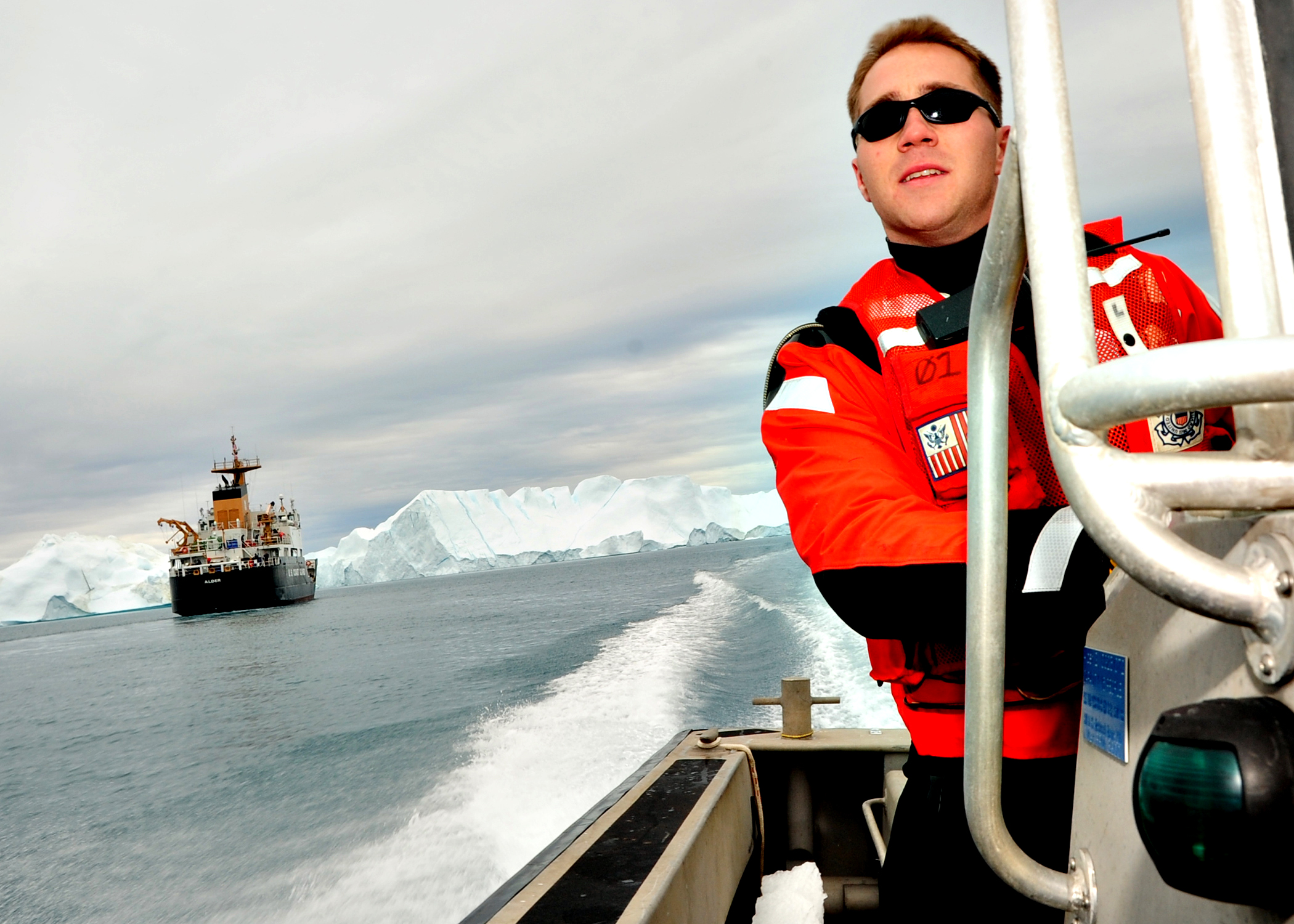
USCG personnel on duty off Greenland's western coast during 2010's Operation Nanook

The Coast Guard Arctic Service Medal was established on 20 May 1976 by Commandant of the Coast Guard Admiral Owen W. Siler. The medal is awarded to any member of the United States Coast Guard who performs twenty-one days of non-consecutive duty afloat or ashore north of the Arctic Circle. Air crews flying in and out of areas north of the Arctic Circle may also be awarded the medal for 21 days of non-consecutive service. The medal depicts a polar bear under the North Star, while the reverse side carries the Coast Guard Shield.

== Eligibility requirements ==
The Coast Guard Arctic Service Medal may be awarded to any person who meets the qualifications related to service in defined geographic areas or at specific duty stations. Only one medal may be awarded per deployment or year in the case of qualifying air crews. Qualifying service is as follows:

- Members of the Coast Guard who, during summer operations (defined as 1 May to 31 October), who serve in any Coast Guard mission north of the Arctic Circle (66°33'N) for 21 non-consecutive days under competent orders.
- Member of the Coast Guard who, during winter operations (defined as 1 November to 30 April), serve or have served aboard a Coast Guard vessel operating in polar waters north of latitude 60 degrees North, specifically in the Bering Sea, Davis Strait, or Denmark Strait for 21 non-consecutive days under competent orders.
- Members of the Coast Guard who serve on the remote LORAN Stations at Cape Atholl, Greenland; Cape Christian, Baffin Island, Canada; Port Clarence, Alaska; Barrow, Alaska; Bø, Norway; Jan Mayen Island, Norway.
- Members of the Coast Guard who participate in flights as a member of the crew of an aircraft flying to or from stations listed above, or any shore locations north of the Arctic Circle in support of Coast Guard missions. The minimum time requirement is 21 non-consecutive days under competent orders, no more than one day of service is credited for flights in and out during any 24-hour period.

Civilians may be recommended for the award of the Coast Guard Arctic Service Medal for their service with the Coast Guard. Recommendations for civilians must be sent directly to the Commandant for an award decision.

== See also ==
- Awards and decorations of the United States military
- Navy Arctic Service Ribbon
- Antarctica Service Medal
