= Christine Siddoway =

American Antarctic researcher

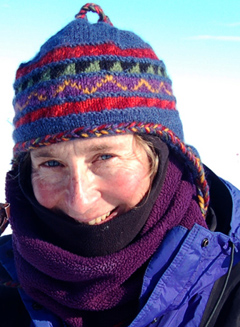
- Born: December 26, 1961
- Other names: Christine Helen Smith, Christine H. Smith, Christine Smith Siddoway
- Education: BSc Carleton College, 1984; MSc University of Arizona, 1987; PhD University of California-Santa Barbara, 1995
- Awards: Fellow of the Geological Society of America; Member of Sigma Xi, the Scientific Research Honor Society; Antarctic Service Medal
- Scientific career
- Fields: Structural geology Tectonics
- Workplaces: Colorado College
- Website: sites.coloradocollege.edu/csiddoway/

Christine Siddoway is an American Antarctic researcher, best known for her work on the geology and tectonics of the Ford Ranges in western Marie Byrd Land. Other discoveries relate to preserved records of continental-interior sedimentation during the Sturtian glaciation, Cryogenian Period, in Rodinia, and evidence of a reduced Pliocene extent of the West Antarctic ice sheet, based upon investigation of clasts transported to/deposited in deep water by ice rafting in the Amundsen Sea.

== Early life and education ==
Siddoway completed her undergraduate education at Carleton College in 1984. Siddoway received a master's degree in 1987 from the University of Arizona, then attended the University of California, Santa Barbara where she earned her PhD in 1995. Her dissertation focused on the only known gneiss dome in Antarctica, in the Fosdick Mountains, Marie Byrd Land. As a graduate student, she began the first of a series of studies in the Fosdick Metamorphic Complex in Marie Byrd Land with her PhD advisor and project principal investigator Bruce Luyendyk.

== Career and impact ==
Siddoway's career includes 12 field research seasons in Antarctica since 1989, plus additional Polar Programs research that entailed laboratory and geospatial work. During initial work in Marie Byrd Land, the central issue was when and how mid crustal rocks found in the Fosdick Metamorphic Complex became exhumed. Her work demonstrated a role for doming, anatexis, and intrusion, within a regional context of right lateral strike slip—leading to a model of rapid exhumation via transtension rather than an orthogonal extension as in a core complex. The detachment fault of the core complex, when found, was discovered to display dextral oblique striae and constrictional fabrics She continued to refine the fundamentals of the process of gneiss dome emplacement authoring a special publication on that topic by the Fosdick range as a type model. An outgrowth of the early work explored the Fosdick Mountains gneiss dome as a repository of information about crustal differentiation leading to stabilization of the landmass of Marie Byrd Land within the Antarctic continent.

Siddoway aided the founding of the SCAR ANTscape project in 2009, which stimulated research leading to reconstruction of the bedrock topography of Antarctica for key intervals of the geologic past—an important parameter for understanding the origins and evolution of the Antarctic ice sheet. More recently, she collaborated with GNS Science and Polar Geospatial Center colleagues to develop Antarctic GeoMap, under the auspices of the Scientific Committee on Scientific Research.

Siddoway's Antarctic work has been funded by the U.S. National Science Foundation, with ten NSF Polar Programs grants received over 22 years. The recent ROSETTA-Ice Project was a collaboration with co-investigators from Columbia University, UC San Diego, and Earth Space Research, with a prevalence of women PIs, to study the framework of the Ross Ice Shelf and Ross Embayment, ROSETTA-ice. The project used airborne geophysics and on-ground investigations and was funded by the National Science Foundation and the Moore Foundation.

Along with her work in Antarctica, Siddoway has pursued research in the Front Range of the Colorado Rocky Mountains. This work led to a surprising result for the age of Cryogenian sandstone dikes within granite host rock, a matter that had been unresolved for more than 125 years. The Tavakaiv quartzite formation contributes to new appreciation of the time of formation of The Great Unconformity in Colorado.

She is currently working on Ice sheet erosional Interaction with Hot Geotherm, ICI-Hot in West Antarctica, International Ocean Discovery Program (IODP) 379, 2019-2021 Amundsen Sea – West Antarctic Ice Sheet History, Cryogenian intracontinental sedimentary records for Rodinia, and Testing the linchpin of WAIS collapse with diatoms and ice rafted debris in Pleistocene and Late Pliocene strata of the Resolution Drift.

Siddoway has served on committees of the Geological Society of America, including as associate editor for the GSA Bulletin. She has also served twice on the Organizing Committee for the International Symposium on Antarctic Earth Sciences (1995, 2007) and on the Transantarctic Mountain Science Planning Committee (2015).

== Awards and honors ==
Siddoway was elected a fellow of the Geological Society of America in 2009 and received the Antarctica Service Medal in 2003. In 2021, she was elected to Sigma Xi, the Scientific Research Honor Society. She was awarded a Fulbright Post-doctoral Research Fellowship in Italy in 1995.

== Selected works ==
- Cox, S.C., Smith Lyttle, B., Elkind, S., Siddoway, C., Morin, P., Capponi, G., Abu-Alam, T. and 22 others, 2023, A continent-wide detailed geological map dataset of Antarctica, Nature Scientific Data, 10, 250, doi:10.1038/s41597-023-02152-9.
- Tikoff, B., Siddoway, C., Sokoutis, D., and Willingshofer, E., 2022, The lithospheric folding model applied to the Bighorn uplift during the Laramide orogeny, in Craddock, J.P., et al., eds., Geological Society of America Special Paper 555, doi:10.1130/2021.2555(08).
- Tankersley, M., Horgan, H., Siddoway, C., Caratori Tontini, F., and Tinto K., 2022, Basement topography and sediment thickness beneath Antarctica's Ross Ice Shelf, Geophysical Research Letters, doi:10.1029/2021GL097371.
- Siddoway, C.S., 2021, Geology of West Antarctica (Chapter 3, pp. 87–131), in Geology of the Antarctic Continent; Stuttgart: Schweizerbart Science Publishers, ISBN 978-3-443-11034-5.
- Siddoway, C.S., 2020, Antarctica, in Encyclopedia of Geology, 2nd edition, Amsterdam: Academic Press, doi:10.1016/B978-0-08-102908-4.00136-3.
- Jordan, T.A., Riley, T.R. and Siddoway, C., 2020, Geology of West Antarctica, Nature Reviews Earth and Environment, doi:10.1038/s43017-019-0013-6, https://rdcu.be/b0OL8 .
- Flowers, R. M., Macdonald, FA., Siddoway, C.S., and Havranek, R., 2020, Diachronous development of the Great Unconformity prior to Snowball Earth, Proceedings of the National Academy of Sciences, doi:10.1073/pnas.1913131117
- Siddoway, C., Palladino, G., Prosser, G., Freedman, D., and Duckworth, W. C., 2019, Basement-hosted sand injectites: Use of field examples to advance understanding of hydrocarbon reservoirs in fractured basement rocks, in Bowman, M. (ed.), Subsurface Sand Remobilization and Injection, Geol. Society of London Special Publication 493, doi:10.1144/SP493-2018-140
- Tinto, K. J., Padman, L., Siddoway, C.S., and 15 others, 2019, Ross Ice Shelf response to climate driven by the tectonic imprint on seafloor bathymetry, Nature Geoscience, 12, 441–449, doi:10.1038/s41561-019-0370-2
- Colleoni, F., De Santis, L., Siddoway, C.S., Bergamasco, A., Golledge, N., Lohmann, G., Passchier, S. and Siegert, M., 2018, Spatio-temporal variability of processes across Antarctic ice-bed-ocean interfaces, Nature Communications, v. 9, 2289, doi:10.1038/s41467-018-04583-0, https://rdcu.be/ZLBl .
- Jensen, J.L,. Siddoway, C. S., Reiners, P.W., Ault, A.K., Thomson, S.N. and Steele-MacInnis, M., 2018, Single-crystal hematite (U-Th)/He dates and fluid inclusions document widespread Cryogenian sand injection in crystalline basement, Earth and Planetary Science Letters, v. 500, 145–155, doi:10.1016/j.epsl.2018.08.021
- Siddoway, C.S., 2010 "Microplate motion" Nature Geoscience: 3(4), pp. 225–226. doi:10.1038/ngeo835
- Siddoway, C. S., 2008 "Tectonics of the West Antarctic Rift System: new light on the history and dynamics of distributed intracontinental extension." Antarctica: A Keystone in a Changing World: 91–114. doi:10.3133/of2007-1047.kp09
- Siddoway, C.S., Baldwin, S.L., Fitzgerald, P.G., Fanning, C.M. and Luyendyk, B.P., 2004. Ross Sea mylonites and the timing of intracontinental extension within the West Antarctic rift system. Geology, 32 (1), pp. 57–60. doi:10.1130/G20005.1
