= Dean Winslow =

American physician and professor (born 1953)

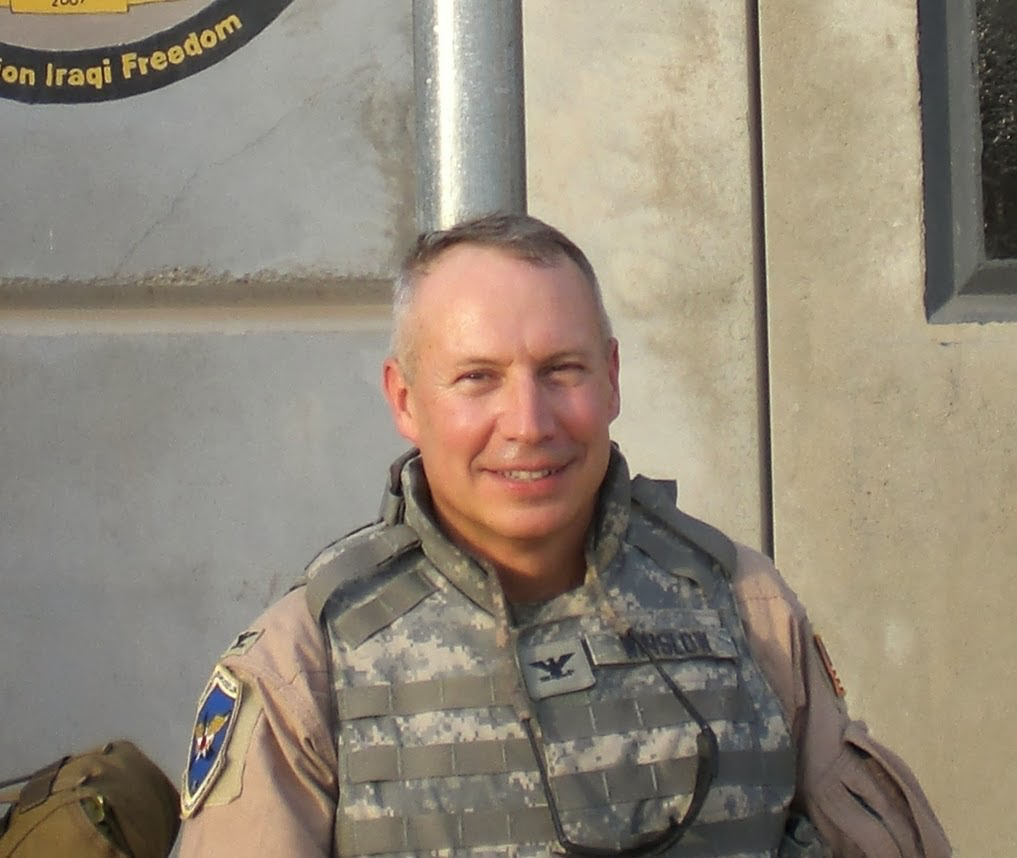
- Born: Dean Lindley Winslow; 1953 (age 72–73); Wood River, Illinois
- Education: Pennsylvania State University; Jefferson Medical College; United States Air Force School of Aerospace Medicine; Air War College
- Military career
- Allegiance: United States
- Branch: United States Air Force; Air National Guard
- Service years: 1980–2015
- Rank: Colonel
- Conflicts: Operation Provide Comfort (1995, 1996) Operation Northern Watch (1997, 2003); Operation New Horizons (1998); Operation Enduring Freedom (2004, 2011); Operation Iraqi Freedom (2003 x 2, 2006, 2008); Joint Task Force Katrina (2005); Operation McCall (2008); Operation Artemis (2021, 2022) Operation Allies Welcome (2021, 2022)
- Medical career
- Institutions: Stanford University

Dean Winslow (born ca. 1953) is an American physician, academic, and retired United States Air Force colonel. He had been nominated by President Donald Trump to become the next Assistant Secretary of Defense for Health Affairs, but he withdrew his nomination in December 2017 after it was put on indefinite hold. He is Professor and former Vice Chair of Medicine at Stanford University. He previously served as Chair of the Department of Medicine and Chief of the Division of AIDS Medicine at the Santa Clara Valley Medical Center. In the Air Force, he deployed twice to Afghanistan and four times to Iraq as a flight surgeon supporting combat operations in Operation Enduring Freedom and Operation Iraqi Freedom.

== Early life and education ==
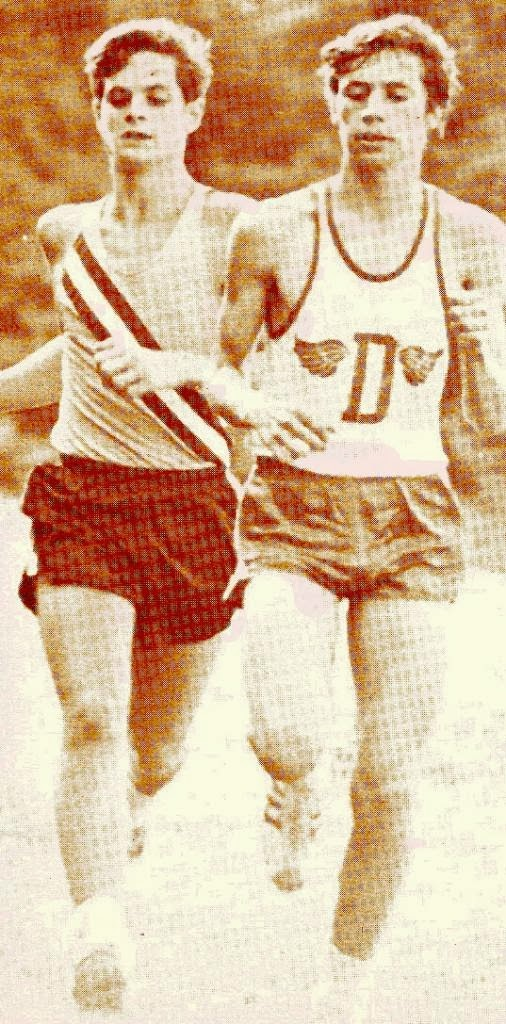
Winslow and Salesianum School runner, Dover, Delaware, 1970.

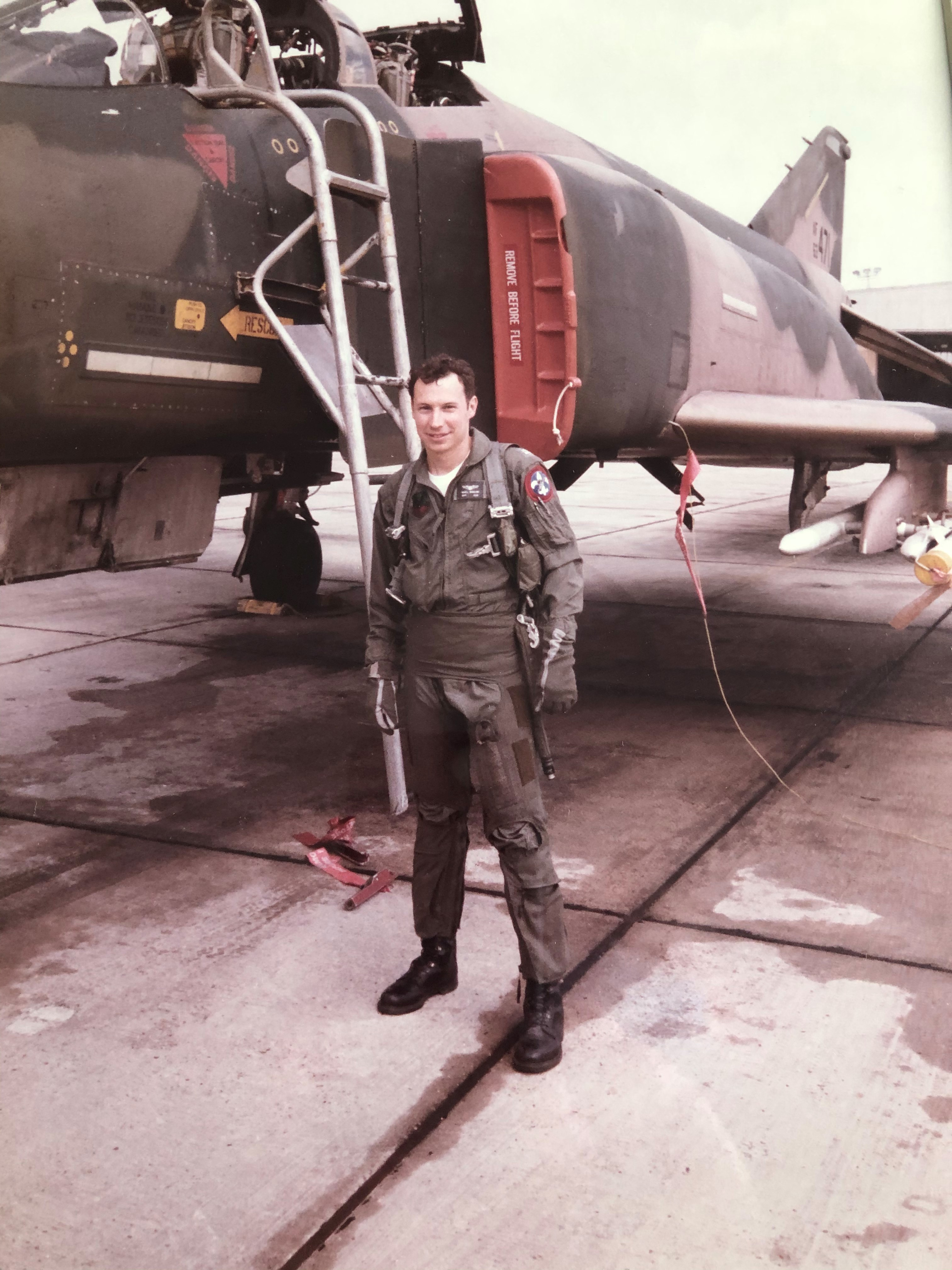
Winslow flying Louisiana ANG F-4C Phantom II, NAS New Orleans, March 1985.

Winslow was born in Illinois to Don Winslow, a patent attorney, and Anna Neff Winslow, a public school teacher. Winslow graduated from Dover High School in 1971, where he was class valedictorian, played varsity football, was co-captain of the track team, and played first violin in the Delaware All-State Orchestra. He received his undergraduate degree (with high distinction) from Pennsylvania State University, where he ran varsity track and cross-country under coach Harry Groves. In 1976, Winslow received his doctorate from Jefferson Medical College and was elected to Alpha Omega Alpha Honor Medical Society. He completed internal medicine residency at Christiana Care Health System and infectious diseases fellowship at Oschner Foundation Hospital.

== Medical career ==
Winslow began his in medical private practice in Wilmington, Delaware where he started the state’s first multidisciplinary clinic for HIV patients in 1985. In 1988 he joined the DuPont Company where he worked both as a bench scientist on HIV drug resistance then later designed the clinical trials supporting FDA approval of efavirenz. In 1999 he became Vice President of Regulatory Affairs at Visible Genetics Inc. and led the FDA clearance of the TRUGENE HIV-1 drug resistance test. Winslow joined the staff at Santa Clara Valley Medical Center in 2003, where he served as Chief of the Division of AIDS Medicine and later as Chair of the Department of Medicine.

Winslow is Professor of Medicine with appointments in the Divisions of Hospital Medicine and Infectious Diseases. He has served on the Stanford faculty since 1998 and served from 2003–2008 as Co-Director of Stanford's Infectious Diseases Fellowship Training Program. In 2015 he was appointed Academic Physician-In-Chief at Stanford/ValleyCare and Vice Chair of the Department of Medicine. He was Lead Physician for the US Antarctic Program of the National Science Foundation 2019–2020 based at McMurdo Station, Antarctica.

Winslow’s professional interests focus on patient care and clinical teaching. Winslow is a Master of the American College of Physicians, Fellow of the Royal College of Physicians, Fellow of the Infectious Diseases Society of America, and the Pediatric Infectious Diseases Society. He is the author of over 100 research papers. He is a member of the IDSA Sepsis Task Force, and previously served as Chair of the Standards and Practice Guidelines Committee. He serves on the editorial board of the journal AIDS.

== Military career ==
Winslow (call sign, “Racer”) entered the Louisiana Air National Guard in 1980 as a general medical officer. He became a flight surgeon in 1983 and he was a Distinguished Graduate of the United States Air Force School of Aerospace Medicine. He served as Commander of the 159th Medical Group 1992–1995 and was State Air Surgeon, Delaware Air National Guard 1995–2011. He served as ANG Assistant to the Commander, 59th Medical Wing, Lackland AFB 2011–2014. His last military assignment before retiring from the Air National Guard in December 2015 was Special Assistant to the Adjutant General, Delaware National Guard.

=== Deployments ===
In November 1998, Winslow led a military medical relief mission to Honduras in the aftermath of Hurricane Mitch. Winslow deployed to the Middle East six times from 2003 to 2011 as a flight surgeon supporting combat operations in Iraq and Afghanistan. From January–April 2003, Winslow was the flight surgeon responsible for combat rescue operations from Tikrit to northern Iraq during the invasion. In September 2005, he coordinated military public health and force protection in Louisiana in the aftermath of Hurricane Katrina. In 2006, Winslow served as an ER physician and flight surgeon at the United States Air Force 447th EMEDS (combat hospital) in Baghdad and in 2008 he returned to serve as hospital commander of the same unit during the Iraq surge. In 2009, Winslow was selected to serve as a physician in Antarctica supporting the National Science Foundation.

He is a 2007 graduate of Air War College. He has served as an infectious disease consultant to the USAF Surgeon General. In March 2020 he returned to active status in the California State Guard to assist with the state's response to the Coronavirus pandemic and the wildfires in California. Winslow served as an advisor on COVID-19 to the Commander, NATO International Security Assistance Force, Afghanistan.

=== Dates of rank ===
Promotions
Rank	Date
Captain	October, 1980
Major	September, 1985
Lieutenant colonel	September, 1989
Colonel	December, 1992

== Philanthropy and Gun Violence Prevention Advocacy ==
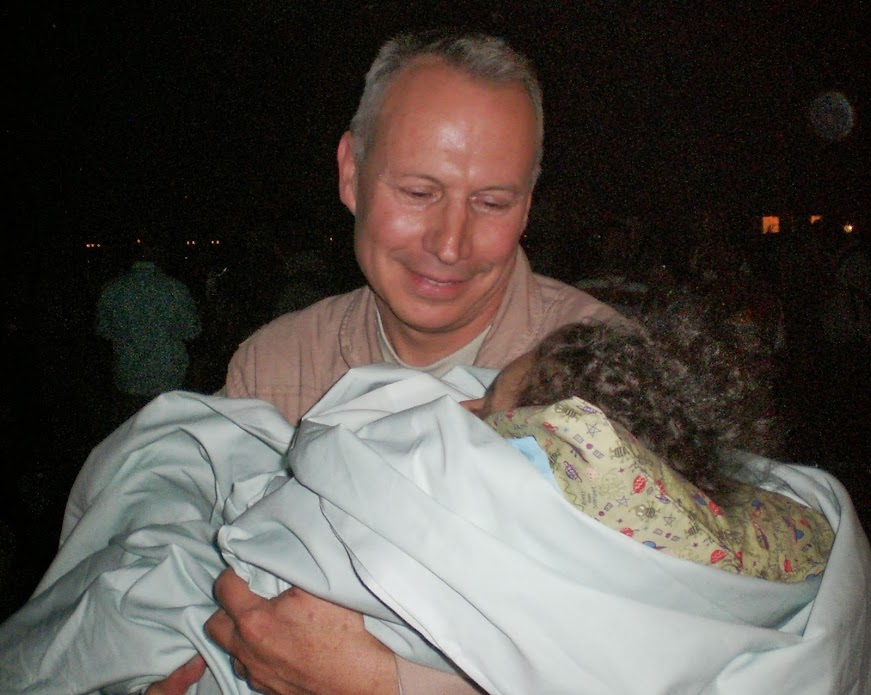
Winslow with a young Iraqi child with severe burns cared for in June 2008. The patient received subsequent care at a US burn center.

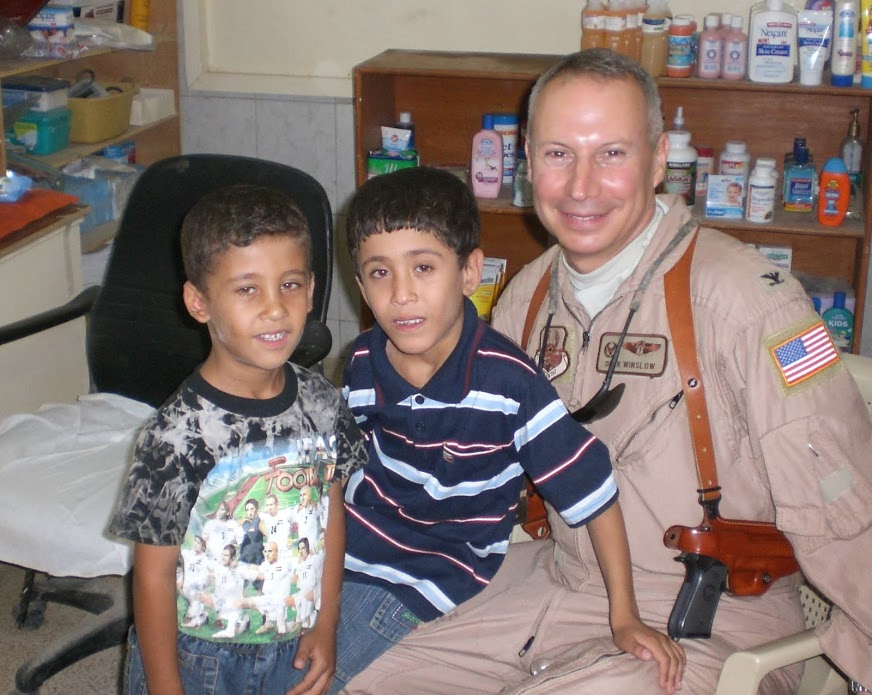
Winslow with two Iraqi boys with congenital heart disease in Baghdad, July 2008. The children later underwent open heart surgery at Nemours Children’s Hospital in Wilmington, Delaware.

Since 2006, Winslow has arranged medical care in the U.S. for 28 Iraqi children who have complicated medical conditions for which care is not available in Iraq.

In 2015, Winslow won a wrongful termination lawsuit against a California civilian hospital. He and his wife, Dr. Julie Parsonnet, used the $1 million settlement to form The Eagle Fund, a charitable trust which provides aid to Middle Eastern and Central American refugees. Donations to date have included United States Fund for UNICEF, International Rescue Committee, Inc., Save the Children, Crisis Action, Inc., Oxfam, Global AIDS Interfaith Alliance, Episcopal Relief and Development, Asylum Access, Sana Relief Fund of Lucille Packard Foundation for Children's Health, American Near East Refugee Aid, Jesuit Refugee Service USA, UNRWA USA National Committee, Iraqi Children Foundation, UNHCR, and Cristosal.

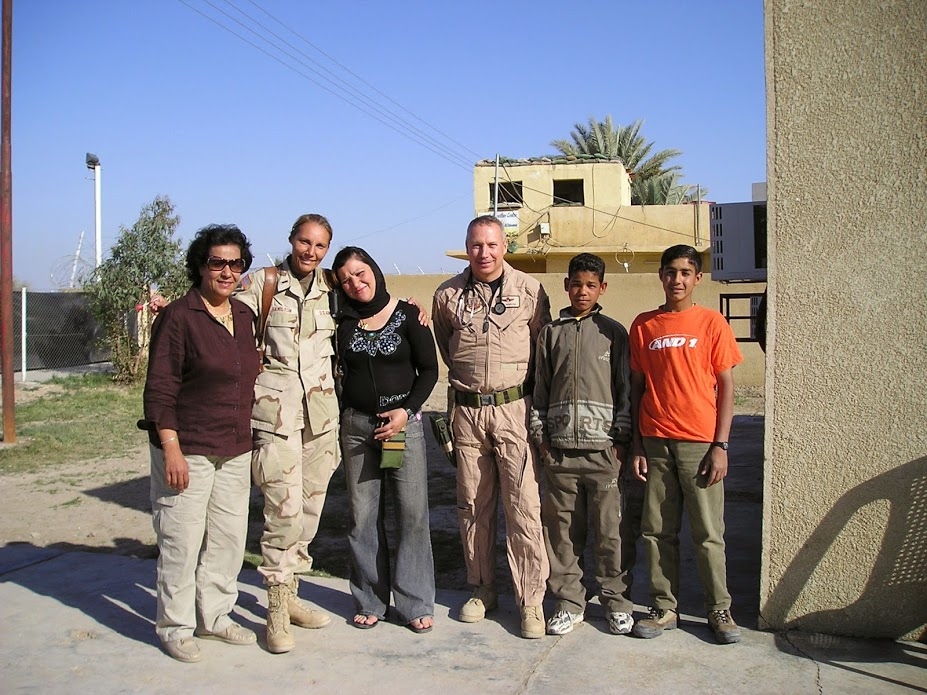
Winslow with US Army nurse, Iraqi medical workers, and two boys. Civil Military Operations Center clinic, Baghdad, 2006

In 2018, Winslow co-founded SAFE: Scrubs Addressing the Firearms Epidemic, an organization which unites health care professionals to address gun violence in the US as a public health issue. SAFE advocates for an increase in federal funding for gun violence research and for lawmakers to implement “evidence-based” gun policy. SAFE has chapters in over 50 medical schools.

== Nomination to become Assistant Secretary of Defense for Health Affairs ==
In September 2017, President Donald Trump nominated Winslow to become the next Assistant Secretary of Defense for Health Affairs. During his November 2017 Senate Armed Services confirmation hearing, Winslow was asked about the Sutherland Springs church shooting that had occurred two days prior. In his response, Winslow said "I'd also like to ... just say how insane it is that in the United States of America a civilian can go out and buy a semi-automatic weapon like an AR-15." His comment drew rebuke from Senator John McCain, the panel's chairman. Winslow's nomination was put on indefinite hold, and Winslow withdrew from consideration in December 2017. Winslow later wrote an editorial in the Washington Post titled "I spoke my mind on guns. Then my Senate confirmation was put on hold." In the editorial, he wrote: "I have seen what [assault weapons like the AR-15] do to human beings. The injuries are devastating."

His nomination for Assistant Secretary of Defense was not formally withdrawn by President Trump but was instead returned unconfirmed to the President by the U.S. Senate on 3 January 2018 under Standing Rules of the United States Senate, Rule XXXI, paragraph 6.

== Senior Advisor to the Centers for Disease Control and Prevention (CDC) ==
On 1 July 2021, Winslow was asked to lead the CDC's COVID-19 Testing and Diagnostics Working Group (TDWG), a $46 billion interagency effort to develop testing-related guidance, expand the available testing supply, and maximize testing capacity in the US.

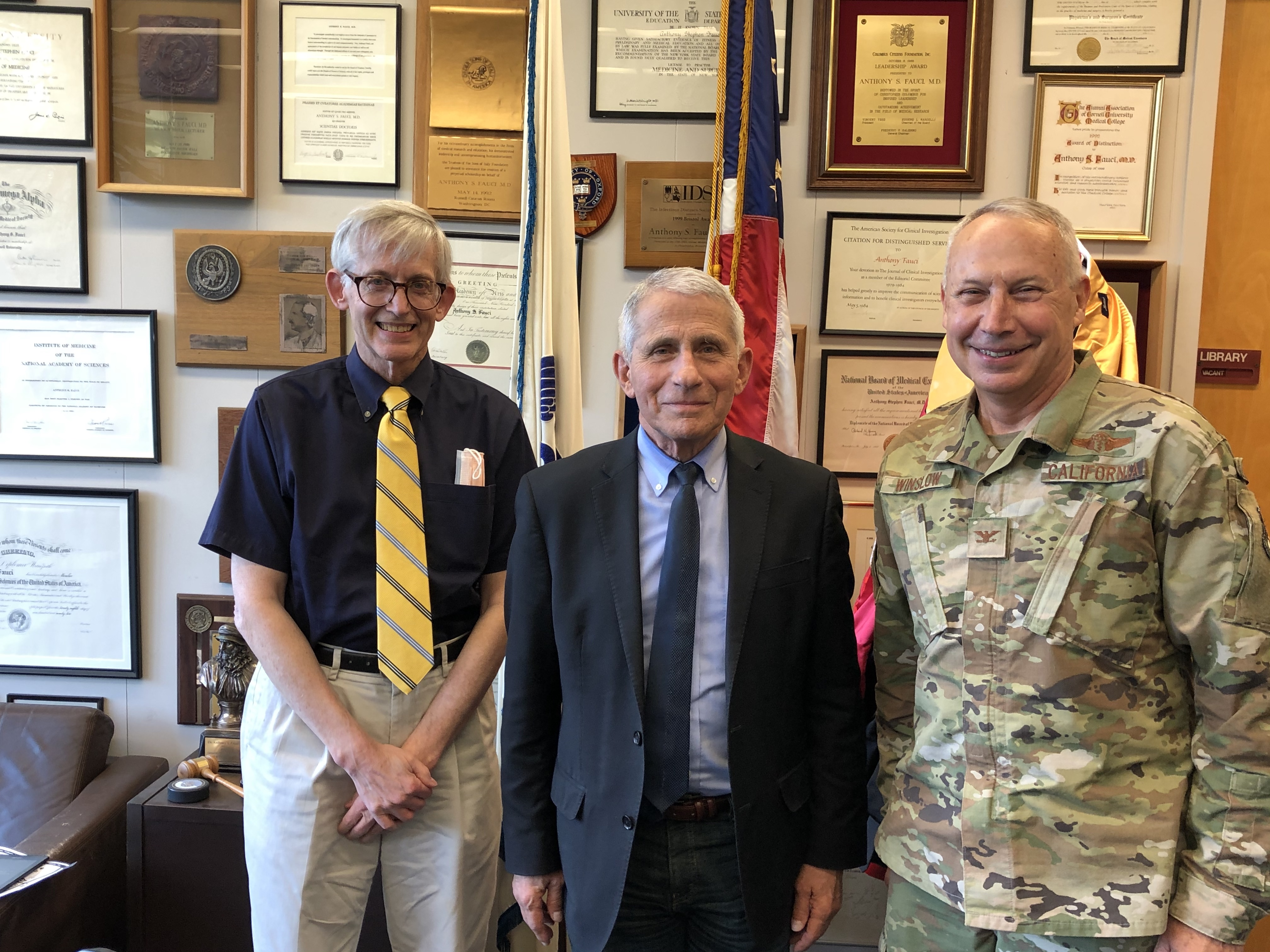
Winslow with Dr. H. Clifford Lane and Dr. Anthony S. Fauci, Bethesda, MD, June 2021.

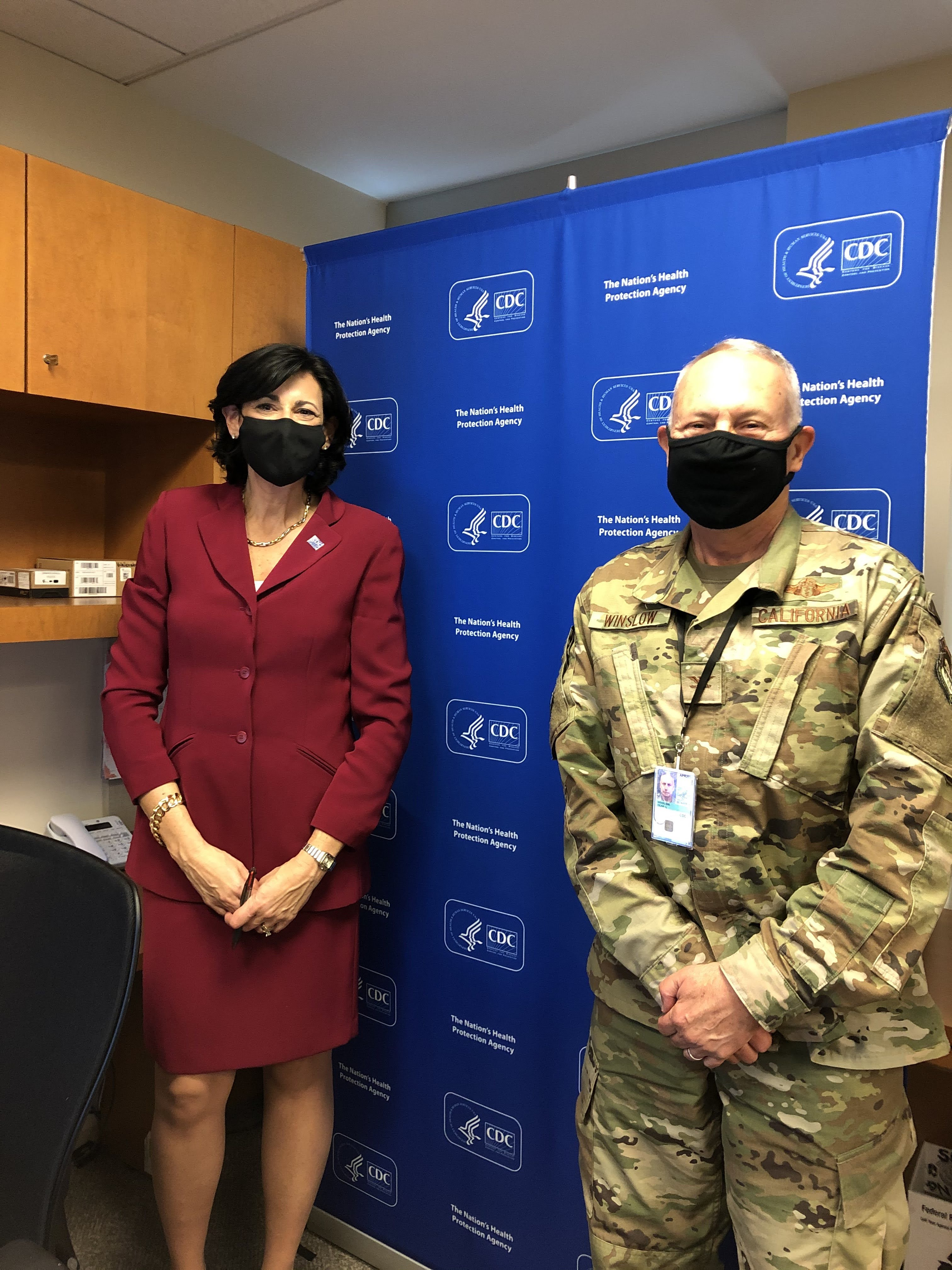
Winslow with CDC Director, Dr. Rochelle Walensky, Washington DC, April 2021.

From August 2021 until July 2022, Winslow served as senior CDC advisor to Operation Allies Welcome, a DHS effort to support and resettle vulnerable Afghans, including those who assisted US forces in Afghanistan. He also served as Chief Medical Officer to the Southwest Border Migrant Health Task Force and senior CDC advisor to the Vaccine Task Force.

== Military awards ==
Winslow's decorations and awards include:

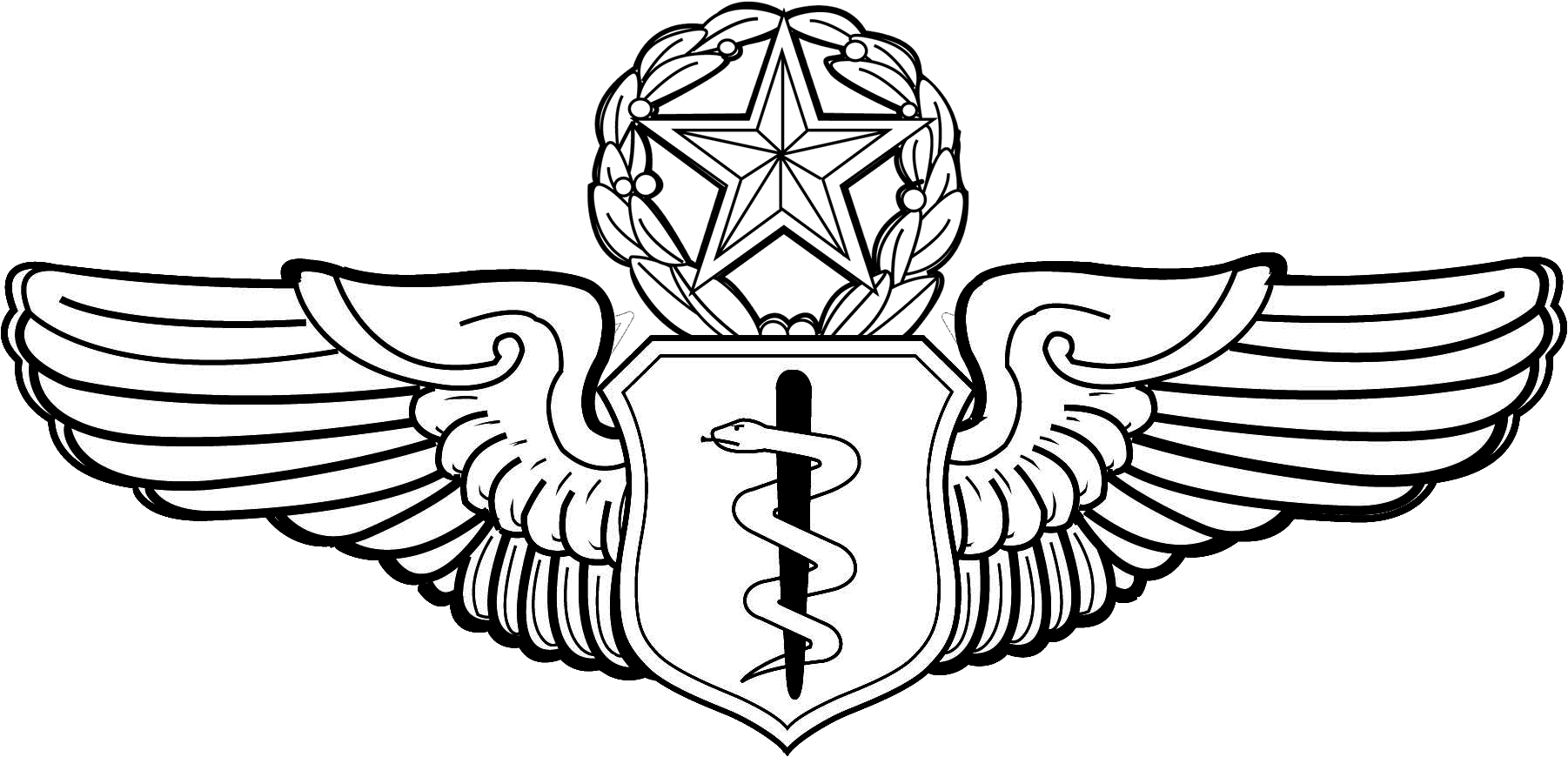

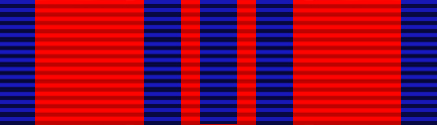

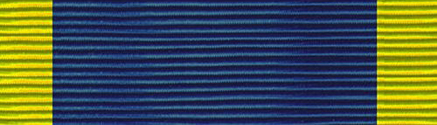

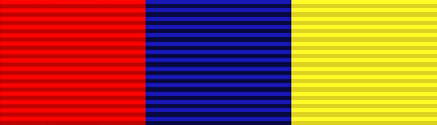

Badge (top)	Chief Flight Surgeon badge			
1st row	Legion of Merit	Meritorious Service Medal with two oak leaf clusters		
2nd row	Public Health Service Outstanding Service Medal	Air Medal with two oak leaf clusters	Aerial Achievement Medal with three oak leaf clusters	Air Force Commendation Medal with two oak leaf clusters
3rd row	Air Force Achievement Medal	Air Force Combat Action Medal	Meritorious Unit Award with one oak leaf cluster	Air Force Outstanding Unit Award
4th row	Air Force Organizational Excellence Award	Public Health Service Outstanding Unit Citation	Combat Readiness Medal with one oak leaf cluster	National Defense Service Medal with one 3/16" bronze star
5th row	Antarctica Service Medal	Armed Forces Expeditionary Medal with one 3/16" bronze star	Southwest Asia Service Medal with three 3/16" bronze star	Afghanistan Campaign Medal with two 3/16" bronze stars
6th row	Iraq Campaign Medal with four 3/16" bronze stars	Global War on Terrorism Expeditionary Medal	Global War on Terrorism Service Medal	Humanitarian Service Medal with one 3/16" bronze star
7th row	Public Health Service COVID-19 Pandemic Campaign Medal	Air Force Overseas Ribbon with one oak leaf cluster	Air Force Expeditionary Service Ribbon with gold frame and four oak leaf clusters	Air Force Longevity Service Ribbon with one silver and three bronze oak leaf clusters
8th row	Armed Forces Reserve Medal with two silver Hourglass devices and bronze award numeral 4	Small Arms Expert Marksmanship Ribbon with one 3/16" bronze star indicating expert qualification on service rifle and pistol	Air Force Training Ribbon	Non-Article 5 NATO Medal for service with ISAF
9th row	Delaware Conspicuous Service Cross	Delaware National Guard Medal for Military Merit with award numeral 2	Delaware National Guard Medal	Delaware National Guard National Defense Service Ribbon
10th row	Delaware National Guard Medal for Service in Aid to Civil Authority	Delaware National Guard Physical Fitness Ribbon with award numeral 16	Louisiana Legion of Merit	Louisiana Emergency Service Medal
11th row	Louisiana General Excellence Ribbon with three fleur de lis devices	Louisiana Longevity Medal with three fleur de lis devices	Mississippi Emergency Service Medal	California National Guard State Service Ribbon
Insignia (bottom)	Air Force Commander's Insignia			

== Civilian awards ==
Winslow's civilian awards include:

- 2025: Service Behind the Uniform Honoree, Iraq and Afghanistan Veterans Association of America
- 2024: Global Citizen Award, GAIA Global Health (Global AIDS Interfaith Alliance)
- 2023: Alumni Fellow Award, Pennsylvania State University
- 2023: Outstanding Service Medal, U.S. Public Health Service
- 2022: Excellence in Emergency Response- Domestic (Toby Merlin Award), for medical and public health support to Operation ALLIES WELCOME, Centers for Disease Control and Prevention
- 2022: Excellence in Emergency Response- Domestic (Toby Merlin Award), for medical and public health support to Operation ALLIES WELCOME, Centers for Disease Control and Prevention
- 2022: Alumni Achievement Award, Sidney Kimmel (Jefferson) Medical College
- 2021: Master, American College of Physicians
- 2020: Chief Residents Award for Dedication to Teaching, Stanford Medicine
- 2019: Wright Brothers Master Pilot Award, Federal Aviation Administration
- 2019: Alwin C. Rambar-James B.D. Mark Award for Excellence in Patient Care, Stanford Medicine
- 2017: Society Citation award, Infectious Diseases Society of America
- 2014 and 2015: David A. Rytand award for excellence in clinical teaching, Stanford Medicine
- 2011: Paul Harris Fellowship – Recognition for humanitarian service, Rotary International
- 2008: Award for Humanitarian Service to the People of Iraq, Iraqi Armed Forces
- 2007: Humanitarian Service Award, American College of Physicians

== Personal life ==
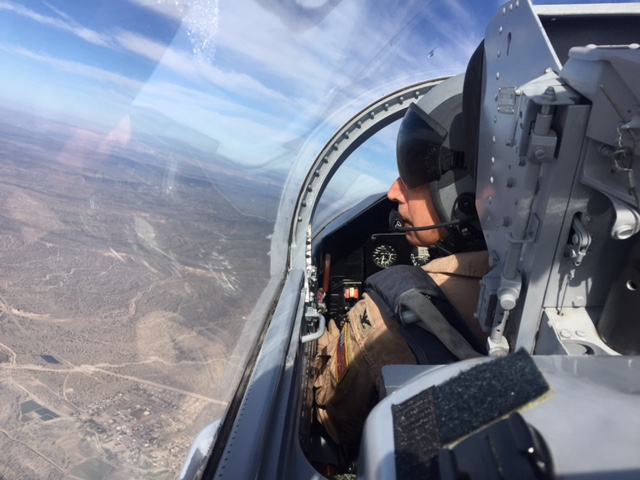
Winslow flying L-39, Santa Fe, NM, April 2019.

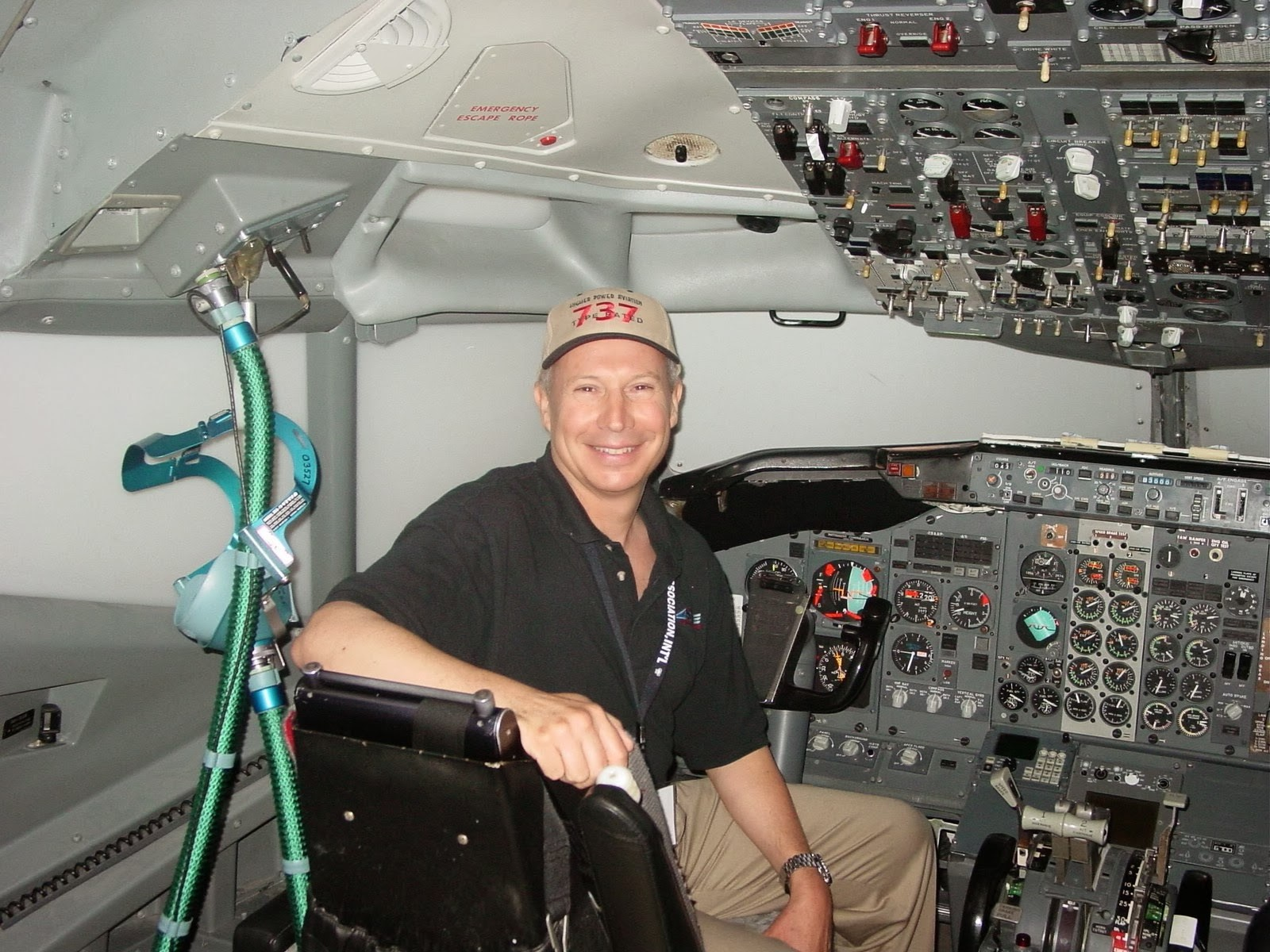
Winslow in Boeing 737–300 full flight simulator, Higher Power Aviation, Dallas, July 2009.

Winslow is married and has four children. His wife is Stanford Professor Julie Parsonnet. His daughter, Lindley Winslow, is an experimental particle physicist and MIT professor.

Winslow soloed in a glider at age 14 and holds an Airline Transport Pilot license and type ratings in the Boeing 737, Douglas DC-3, the L-29 Delfin, and L-39 Albatross jets.

He is an Episcopalian and has served on the vestry of the Church of the Epiphany of San Carlos, California.
