= Finnemore Peak =

Mountain in Antarctica

Finnemore Peak (77°23′50″S 160°51′56″E) is a summit, 2,050 metres (6,730 ft), at the south end of the ridge that separates the head of Wreath Valley and Albert Valley in Apocalypse Peaks, Victoria Land. Named in 2005 by the Advisory Committee on Antarctic Names after Michelle Rogan-Finnemore who wintered twice with the U.S. Antarctic Program: the first time in 1990 at Amundsen–Scott South Pole Station as U.S. Geological Survey (USGS) team leader for geodesy and seismology observations; a second winter at McMurdo Station in 1992 entailed satellite observations and ionospheric studies for the University of Texas in Austin; later, Manager of Gateway Antarctica, the center for Antarctic Studies and Research, at the University of Canterbury in Christchurch, New Zealand.
