= Michelle Rogan-Finnemore =

American geologist

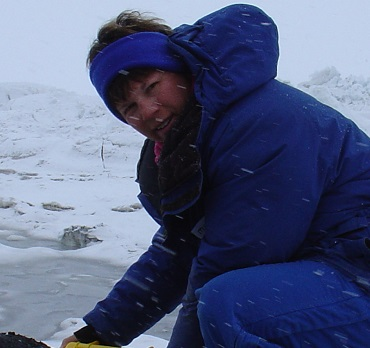
- Education: BSc in Geology, University of Canterbury; LLB, LLM, University of Pittsburgh
- Known for: Executive Secretary of COMNAP
- Awards: Antarctic Service Medal Christchurch City Council Civic Award
- Scientific career
- Fields: Geology Law
- Workplaces: Council of Managers of National Antarctic Programs (COMNAP)

Michelle Rogan-Finnemore is a New Zealand-American science administrator, and currently the Executive Secretary of the Council of Managers of National Antarctic Programmes (COMNAP) which is the international association which brings together the National Antarctic Programs that make up its members. She is also the namesake of Finnemore Peak.

== Early life and education ==
Rogan-Finnemore completed her BSc (Hons) in Geology from the University of Pittsburgh. She then completed a Bachelor of Laws (LLB) and a Master of Laws (LLM) both from the University of Canterbury, NZ. The title of her Masters thesis was "The legal implications of bioprospecting in the Antarctic region."

== Career and impact ==
Rogan-Finnemore was the Manager of Gateway Antarctica, the center for Antarctic Studies and Research, (University of Canterbury) before taking on role of Executive Secretary of COMNAP on July 1, 2009 at which point the COMNAP Secretariat moved to Gateway Antarctica at the University of Canterbury, New Zealand.

Rogan-Finnemore has twice wintered in Antarctica with the U.S.A. Antarctic Program, firstly at the Amundsen–Scott South Pole Station in 1990 as the team leader for geodesy and seismology observations for the U.S. Geological Survey and secondly at McMurdo Station in 1992. During the second season, Rogan-Finnemore conducted ionospheric studies and satellite observations for the University of Texas. She has also worked in Antarctica over many summer seasons.

She has been a delegate or head of delegation to eleven Antarctic Treaty Consultative Meetings. She has given talks about being a woman in Antarctica, including at the 2014 IceFest Antarctic Festival in Christchurch, New Zealand.

== Awards and honors ==
In recognition of her Antarctic service, Rogan-Finnmore was awarded the US Antarctic Service Medal twice in both 1990 and 1992. Finnemore Peak was named after her in 2005 by the Advisory Committee on Antarctic Names.

In 2014, Rogan-Finnemore received the Christchurch City Council Civic Award for her contributions to Antarctic Science. This award was presented by Mayor Lianne Dalziel saying that each recipient of the award represents the highest ideal of citizenship – dedication and outstanding service to others. Mayor Dalziel expressed her gratitude and appreciation to the awardees.
