= Paul Tasch =

American paleontologist

- Born: November 28, 1910; New York City
- Died: July 13, 2001 (aged 90); Wichita, Kansas
- Education: State University of Iowa
- Known for: clam shrimp
- Awards: Fellow of the Geological Society of America, Fellow of the American Association for the Advancement of Science, Fellow of the Paleontological Society, Antarctic Service Medal
- Scientific career
- Fields: Invertebrate paleontology
- Workplaces: University of Connecticut, North Dakota Agriculture College, Moorhead State University, Wichita State University

Paul Tasch (born November 28, 1910, in New York City, died July 13, 2001, in Wichita, Kansas) was an American paleontologist.

Tasch served in the US Army Signal Corps during World War II. He graduated from City College of New York with a bachelor's degree in 1948, and from Pennsylvania State University with a master's degree in 1950. Tasch received his doctorate in 1952 from the State University of Iowa, and was an instructor at the University of Connecticut and from 1953 assistant professor at the North Dakota Agriculture College. In 1954 he became an associate professor at Moorhead State University and in 1955 professor at Wichita State University. He retired in 1982.

As a paleontologist, he studied Conchostraca. He used the paleogeography of fossil clam shrimp in the southern hemisphere (including Antarctica) and the clues that result from it to support the theory of continental drift. He also did research on fossil bacteria in Permian salt formations, and in the history of geology (especially Charles Darwin and Charles Lyell).

He contributed the Branchiopoda chapter to the Arthropoda volume of the Treatise on Invertebrate Paleontology.

In 1970 he received the Antarctic Service Medal from the US Congress. Tasch Peak in the Crary Mountains in Antarctica is named after him.
