= Eugene L. Boudette =

American geologist

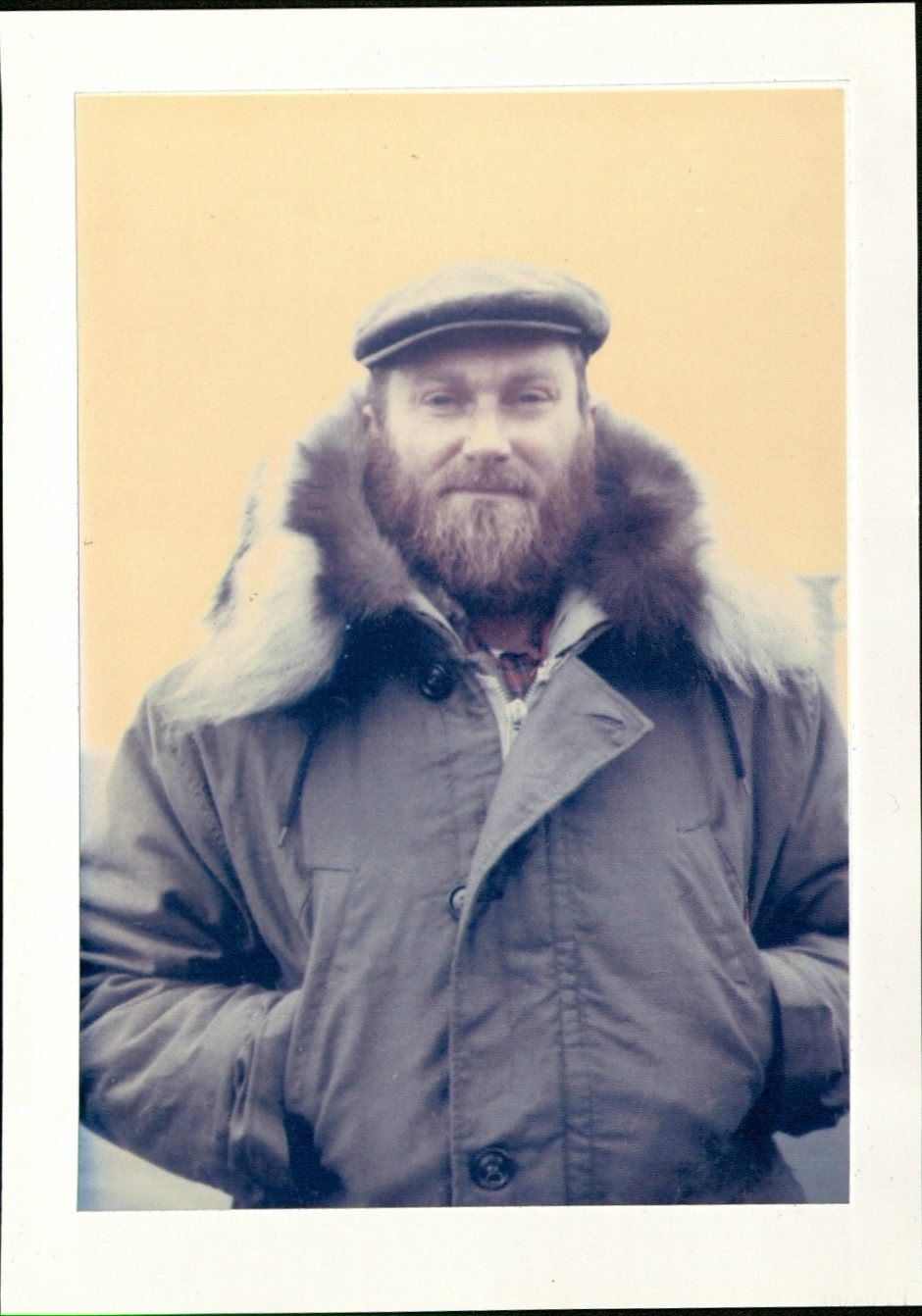
- Dr. Eugene L. Boudette while on assignment with the United States Geological Survey in Antarctica
- Born: August 24, 1926; Claremont, New Hampshire
- Died: November 10, 2007 (aged 81); Concord, New Hampshire
- Education: University of New Hampshire (B.S.); Dartmouth College (M.S., Ph.D.)
- Occupations: Geologist, Professor
- Spouse: Beatrice (Drolet) Boudette
- Parent(s): William E. and Ida (Young) Boudette

Eugene L. Boudette (August 24, 1926 – November 10, 2007) was an American geologist and professor who served as the State Geologist of New Hampshire between 1986 and 2000. Over the course of his life, Boudette also worked for the New England Division of the Army Corps of Engineers, the United States Geological Survey, NASA's Apollo Field Geology Investigation Team, and was a professor of geology at the University of New Hampshire. During his career, he authored or coauthored more than 80 geologic publications. Boudette Peaks in Antarctica were named after him by the Advisory Committee on Antarctic Names for his mapping of the range while in the US Geological Survey.

== Early life ==
Eugene Boudette was born in Claremont, New Hampshire, to William E. and Ida (Young) Boudette. He had five siblings, Norma, Thelma, Nathalie, William, and Earl, and they spent their childhood in Claremont and North Charlestown. Boudette graduated from Holden High School in Charlestown in 1944 and immediately entered the US Navy, serving until 1946. While in the Navy during World War II, Boudette trained and specialized in aircraft electronics at the Naval Air Station in Jacksonville, Florida. He served in the Pacific theatre at Marpi Point Field on Saipan and spent some time at the Quonset Point Air National Guard Station in Rhode Island. He was awarded the World War II Pacific and American Theater service medals and the Victory Medal for his efforts. Following the war, Boudette used the G.I. Bill to attend the University of New Hampshire, and graduated with a B.S. in geology in 1951.

== Career ==
=== Army Corps of Engineers ===
Directly after graduating from UNH, Boudette joined with the New England Division of the US Army Corps of Engineers in a geological surveying role. His early work consisted of dam site evaluation for civilian needs, but he was quickly shifted into military projects, namely the construction of airfields and Army installations across New England. His geological work helped in the expedited construction of the Nike Missile Defense System of Boston and Limestone Air Force Base in northern Aroostook County, Maine.

About a year into his stint with the Army Corps of Engineers, Boudette was sent to the northern Greenland icecap for experimental work using ice drills. The army was looking into ways to build installation foundations on the ice, and Boudette's background in rock drilling for dam installations made him an ideal candidate for test drilling in the icecap. Though they encountered a multitude of problems with the drills not withstanding the polar conditions, Boudette and his team successfully tested the drilling procedures for a base that would later become Camp Century.

=== United States Geological Survey ===
After his tour in Greenland, Boudette returned to the United States, where he interviewed for and was extended a role in the United States Geological Survey (USGS) in 1953. Between 1953 and 1956, Boudette worked with the Trace Element Program Cooperative (TEPCO) in Grand Junction, Colorado. Under TEPCO, Boudette assisted in locating and building the United States' reserves of weapons-grade uranium in the continental United States.

Beginning in 1957, Boudette pursued his master's degree at Dartmouth College, where he wrote his master's thesis on the thermodynamics of plagioclase. After he completed his master's, the USGS assigned Boudette to the United States Antarctic Research Program.

Boudette first traveled to Antarctica in 1959 to partake in the 1959-1960 Marie Byrd Land Traverse Party to study the geology and glaciology of the West Antarctic and to determine the feasibility of geological mapping of the area. The 1,200-mile (1,900 km) trip went from the Byrd Station to the Weddell Sea to the Clark Mountains and back to Byrd. One of Boudette's major goals during the traverse was to locate two 9,000-foot (2,700 m) peaks that were inaccurately mapped by air. Boudette discovered the true location of the twin peaks in the Executive Committee Range, and the mountain was named Boudette Peaks in his honor by the Advisory Committee on Antarctic Names. The success of the 1959–1960 Marie Byrd Land Traverse Party prompted the USGS to plan another traverse for the summer of 1960–1961 called the Victoria Land Traverse under Boudette's leadership. Unfortunately, the Antarctic summer of 1960–1961 was plagued by logistical problems, sunspots interrupting communications, and inclement weather, causing the Victoria Land Traverse to delay and ultimately miss its objectives. To further complicate matters, Boudette, while in New Zealand awaiting a flight down to Antarctica, was subjected to a Navy medical review that found he had diabetes. The disease disqualified him from all future field research projects in Antarctica, and he relinquished his duties to Art Ford, another USGS geologist. Boudette was awarded the Antarctica Service Medal by the Department of Defense for his contributions to the geological mapping of Antarctica.

=== Apollo Field Geology Investigation Team ===
Between 1961 and 1971, Eugene Boudette was mainly based out of Washington, D.C., from where he did field work in Maine as well as worked as a USGS geologic map editor. In January 1971, Boudette was sent to the USGS office in Flagstaff, Arizona, to participate in the Apollo Field Geology Investigation Team (AFGIT). In this role, he assisted in the mapping of potential landing sites for the Apollo Missions 15, 16, and 17 through the study of photogeologic mapping from previous missions. He also participated in field training missions with astronauts to simulate the lunar landing sites. Boudette travelled to impact craters on the Canadian Shield and volcanic centers in Hawaii, teaching astronauts about the geological similarities between the Earth and Moon and how to perform geologic sampling in a lunar environment. Boudette is cited as one of the major contributors to the geological mapping for the landing sites of the final three Apollo missions.

== Retirement and later life ==
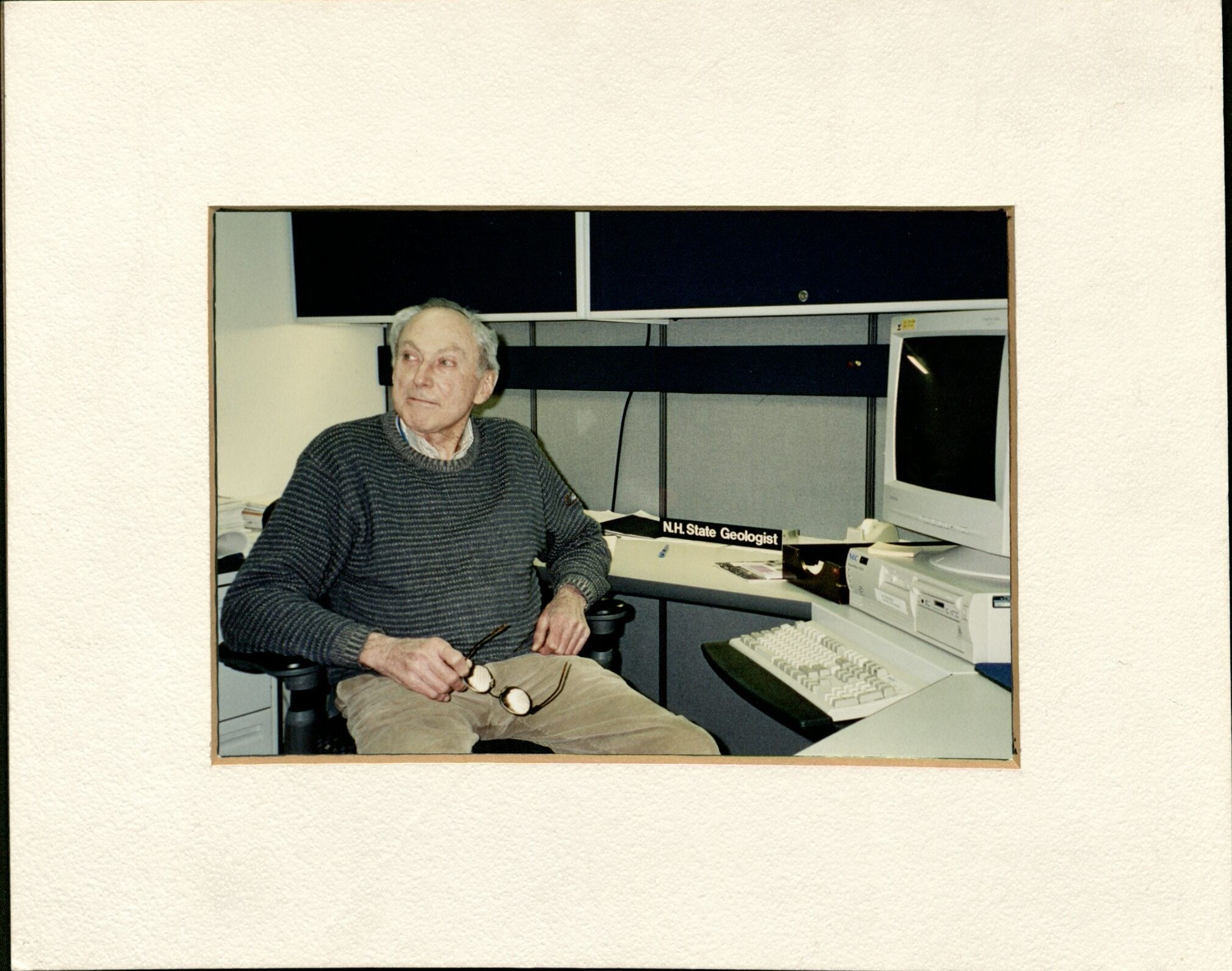
Dr. Eugene Boudette in his office as the New Hampshire State Geologist

Eugene Boudette earned his Ph.D. in geology at Dartmouth in 1978. He continued working with the US Geological Survey until his retirement in 1986. After his retirement from government service, Boudette was appointed New Hampshire State Geologist and served until 2000. In his retirement years, he also took a position as a professor of geology at the University of New Hampshire. Boudette continued to research and write about various geological topics in New Hampshire late into his life. Eugene Boudette died at the age of 81 on November 10, 2007, at Concord Hospital in New Hampshire.

== Awards and decorations ==

1st row	Good Conduct Medal	American Campaign Medal	Asiatic-Pacific Campaign Medal (with at least 1 campaign star)
2nd row	World War II Victory Medal	National Defense Service Medal	Antarctica Service Medal
