= Bruce P. Luyendyk =

American geophysicist and oceanographer (born 1943)

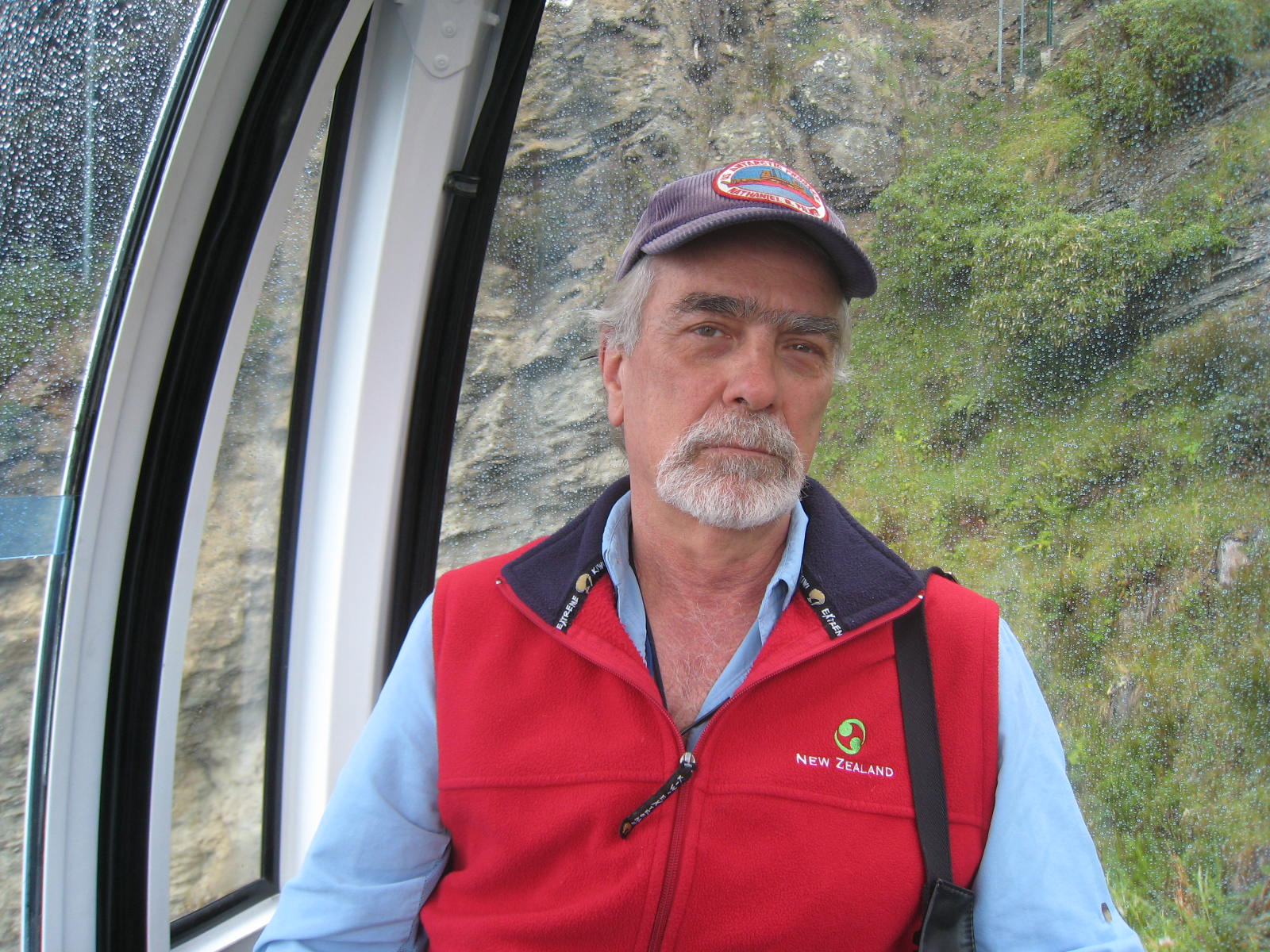
- Luyendyk during his visit to New Zealand.
- Born: 1943 (age 82–83)
- Education: BSc San Diego State University; PhD University of California, San Diego
- Known for: Ocean spreading centers; tectonic rotation of the California Transverse Ranges; tectonics of Marie Byrd Land, Antarctica; marine hydrocarbon seeps
- Awards: Fellow of the AGU; Fellow of the GSA; Antarctic Service Medal; Newcomb Cleveland Prize of the AAAS; Fellow of the American Association for the Advancement of Science
- Scientific career
- Fields: Marine geophysics Tectonics
- Workplaces: Woods Hole Oceanographic Institution; University of California - Santa Barbara
- Website: www.geol.ucsb.edu/people/bruce-luyendyk

Bruce Peter Luyendyk (born 1943) is an American geophysicist and oceanographer, currently professor emeritus of marine geophysics at the University of California, Santa Barbara. His work spans marine geology of the major ocean basins, the tectonics of southern California, marine hydrocarbon seeps, and the tectonics and paleoclimate of Antarctica. His research includes tectonic rotations of the California Transverse Ranges, participation in the discovery of deep-sea hydrothermal vents, quantitative studies of marine hydrocarbon seeps, and geologic exploration of the Ford Ranges in Marie Byrd Land, Antarctica.

Antarctica's Mount Luyendyk is named in honor of his research in the area.

== Early life and education ==
Bruce Luyendyk and his family moved to San Diego, California, in 1956 where he continued his public-school education. Luyendyk attended San Diego State University (SDSU) where he obtained a bachelor's degree in geology and geophysics. He then attended the Scripps Institution of Oceanography (SIO) at the University of California, San Diego, where he earned his PhD in 1969. He studied under Fred Spiess and Henry Menard. That research employed the newly designed deep towed instrument package of the Marine Physical Lab. He followed his PhD with a postdoctoral fellowship at the Woods Hole Oceanographic Institution (WHOI). His supervisors were Carl Bowin and James Heirtzler.

== Career and impact ==
While an undergraduate geology student at San Diego State, Luyendyk participated in marine geologic expedition PROA with SIO. That expedition, to the western and south Pacific, and led by Robert Fisher and William Riedel, inspired Luyendyk to follow an education and career in oceanography.

After his postdoctorate at WHOI, Luyendyk was appointed there as Assistant Scientist. He participated in the FAMOUS expeditions (FAMOUS: French-American Mid-Ocean Undersea Study) to the Mid-Atlantic Ridge where, along with Ken Macdonald, he mapped the rift valley with the Marine Physical Lab deep tow.

=== California geology and tectonics ===
Luyendyk moved to UCSB in 1973, where he began research in southern California tectonics using paleomagnetism. His projects include documenting the ninety degree or greater clockwise rotation of the Transverse Ranges during the Neogene Period of the Cenozoic Era.

=== Drilling into Deep Ocean Floor ===
Luyendyk led two expeditions of the Deep Sea Drilling Project. Principal discoveries included that of a basin-wide unconformity of Oligocene age in the Indian Ocean that was likely related to initiation of ice sheets in Antarctica and uplift of the Reykjanes Ridge due to the Iceland hot spot. Five holes drilled in the rift valley of the Mid Atlantic ridge recovered the youngest rock drilled at the time from the Atlantic sea floor, supporting models of sea floor spreading.

=== Hydrothermal vents ===
In the late 1970s, Luyendyk joined Spiess and Macdonald and an international contingent in forming the RISE project (Rivera Submersible Experiments) to explore the East Pacific Rise at 21° N latitude with the WHOI submersible ALVIN. Here the team discovered deep-sea hydrothermal vents and associated “black smokers” chimneys. This research earned the team the Newcomb Cleveland Prize from the American Association for the Advancement of Science (see 1980, Spiess, Macdonald and 20 coauthors).

=== Marine hydrocarbon seeps ===
During the 1990s, Luyendyk and colleagues began a study of the marine hydrocarbon seep field at Coal Oil Point, California. The object was to quantify oil and natural gas emission from these submarine features. Their work determined that these are likely the largest known marine seeps. They discovered a decrease in seepage over the prior two decades. They attributed this to ongoing oil and gas production from wells that penetrated the source reservoirs of the seep field.

=== Antarctic research ===
In the late 1980s, Luyendyk and David Kimbrough of SDSU launched two expeditions to the Ford Ranges of Marie Byrd Land in West Antarctica. One rationale was to search out matching geologic features related to ones known in New Zealand, which once was joined in Gondwana to this part of Antarctica. Stephen M. Richard was a member of these two expeditions, known as FORCE (Ford Ranges Crustal Exploration). Antarctic geologist Christine Smith Siddoway accompanied them to conduct her graduate dissertation work on metamorphism and deformation within the Fosdick Mountains. Findings of this research include the history of development of the Fosdick Mountains migmatite gneiss dome and Ford Ranges. Follow-on research by others discerned the recent retreat of the West Antarctic Ice Sheet in the region, first noted here by the FORCE expeditions.

Luyendyk led three marine research expeditions in the adjacent Ross Sea. The expeditions focused upon remote and difficult-to-access sectors of Antarctica, bordering the southern Pacific Ocean. The marine surveys of the Coulman High, carried out jointly with L. Bartek and D. S. Wilson, represented the opportunity for access to a sector of the Ross Sea that had been long-concealed beneath the Ross Ice Shelf. The expeditions followed closely upon the calving and breakout of the C-19 iceberg in 2002. Based on these surveys the ANDRILL program recommended a deep drill site within the surveyed area of Coulman High.

In the later part of the 1990s, Luyendyk teamed with Andrea Donnellan of the Jet Propulsion Laboratory to use GPS to measure the rate of opening across the Ross Embayment between West and East Antarctica. They found no stretching within the margins for error but did detect vertical motion due to post glacial isostatic rebound.

In the early 2000s, Luyendyk, along with D.S. Wilson and C. Siddoway, made aerogeophysical and linked ground surveys in the greater region of the Ford Ranges. These surveys revealed buried features that gave clues to the tectonic history of the region. Data from the survey were incorporated into the new bedrock map of Antarctica known as Bedmap2. Achieved through joint work with Douglas S. Wilson, revelations about the topography of the subglacial and nearshore marine environments of the eastern Ross Sea led to an interpretation of paleotopography at a time of climate transition that preceded continental glaciation of Antarctica. The work provided a basis for a climate model for the development of the early Antarctic Ice Sheet.

=== Zealandia ===
In 1995, Luyendyk proposed a model for the fragmentation of Gondwana that included the New Zealand microcontinent and several other pieces of continental crust. He collectively named the now submerged continent that includes the nation of New Zealand, Zealandia. Since that time, New Zealand geologists have made the case that their nation sits atop the world’s eighth continent.

== Awards and honors ==
Luyendyk shared the Newcomb Cleveland Prize of the American Association for the Advancement of Science in 1980. Luyendyk was elected Fellow of the Geological Society of America in 1975. In 2002 he was elected a Fellow of the American Geophysical Union. In 2016, the U.S. Board of Geographic Names recognized Luyendyk’s contributions to Antarctic science with a name designation, Mount Luyendyk, to a summit in Marie Byrd Land. In 2018 he was elected a Fellow of the American Association for the Advancement of Science.

== Professional leadership ==
Luyendyk has held a succession of science administration positions during his academic career, including founding Director of the Institute for Crustal Studies (1988-1997; now Earth Research Institute) and Chair of the Department of Geological Sciences at UC Santa Barbara (1997-2003; now Earth Science), followed by a term as Associate Dean of Mathematical, Life, and Physical Sciences at UC Santa Barbara (2005-2010). His professional service included service for international Antarctic research. He served on the ANDRILL (Antarctic Drilling) Science Committee for a decade, beginning in 2005, and he led the USA's work in hosting the 10th International Symposium on Antarctic Earth Sciences in Santa Barbara, CA, in 2007. The ISAES returned to USA after a hiatus of thirty years since the first USA-hosted symposium in 1977, in Madison, WI. The 2007 conference was the first to publish the Symposium volume in digital format, on-line.

== Selected works ==
- Geometric model for Neogene crustal rotations in southern California. Geological Society of America Bulletin, v. 91 (4), 211-217, 1980. Luyendyk, B. P., M.J. Kamerling, and R. Terres.
- A model for Neogene crustal rotations, transtension, and transpression in southern California. Geological Society of America Bulletin, v. 103 (11), 1528-1536, 1991. Luyendyk, B. P.
- Simple shear of southern California during Neogene time suggested by paleomagnetic declinations. Journal of Geophysical Research: Solid Earth 90 (B14), 12454-12466, 1985. B. P. Luyendyk, M. J. Kamerling, R. R. Terres, and J. S. Hornafius.
- The origin and history of abyssal hills in the northeast Pacific. Geological Society of America Bulletin, v. 81: 2237-2260. 1970, Luyendyk, B. P.
- An experimental approach to the paleocirculation of the oceanic surface waters. Geological Society of America Bulletin, 83: 2649-2664, 1972. Luyendyk, B. P., D. Forsyth, and J. D. Phillips.
- On-bottom gravity profile across the East Pacific Rise crest at 21° north. Geophysics, 49, no. 12: 2166-2177, 1984. Luyendyk, B. P.
- Geological and geophysical investigations in the northern Ford Ranges, Marie Byrd Land, West Antarctica. in Yoshida, Y. et al. (eds.) Recent Progress in Antarctic Earth Science, Terra Pub., Tokyo, 279-288, 1992. Luyendyk, B. P., Richard, S. M., Smith, C. H., and D. L. Kimbrough.
- Hypothesis for Cretaceous Rifting of East Gondwana caused by Subducted Slab Capture. Geology, v. 23, 373-376, 1995. Luyendyk, B. P.
- Structural and tectonic evolution of the Ross Sea rift in the Cape Colbeck region, Eastern Ross Sea, Antarctica. Tectonics, v. 20(6), pp. 933–958, 2001. Luyendyk, B. P., C. C. Sorlien, D. Wilson, L. Bartek, and C. H. Siddoway.
- Hypothesis for Increased Atmospheric Methane Input from Hydrocarbon Seeps on Exposed Continental Shelves during Glacial Low Sea Level. Marine and Petroleum Geology, 22 (4), 591-596, 2005. Luyendyk, B. P., J. P. Kennett, and J. Clark.
