= West Antarctic Rift System =

Series of rift valleys between East and West Antarctica

Map of Antarctica showing West Antarctic Rift System in rose shading

The West Antarctic Rift System is a series of rift valleys between East and West Antarctica. It encompasses the Ross Embayment, the Ross Sea, the area under the Ross Ice Shelf and a part of Marie Byrd Land in West Antarctica, reaching to the base of the Antarctic Peninsula. It has an estimated length of 3,000 km (1,900 mi) and a width of approximately 700 km (430 mi). Its evolution is due to lithospheric thinning of an area of Antarctica that resulted in the demarcation of East and West Antarctica. The scale and evolution of the rift system has been compared to that of the Basin and Range Province of the Western United States.

== Geology ==
West Antarctic Rift System (between red dash lines). Dots are geologic drill holes. Insert map shows approximate extent.

Exploration of the geology of the West Antarctic Rift System is limited because apart from peaks of the Transantarctic Mountains that protrude above the ice, much of the region is covered by the Ross Ice Shelf and the vast West Antarctic Ice Sheet. Several mountain ranges are located at the eastern boundary in Marie Byrd Land. Consequently, the rift is less well known than other major rift valley systems. It is known that like the East African Rift, the West Antarctic Rift System comprises a number of much shorter rifts that cross Antarctica. Beneath the floor of the Ross Sea four rift basins have been detected by marine seismic reflections surveys. Rift basins have been mapped under the West Antarctic Ice Sheet including the Bentley Subglacial Trench.

== Evolution ==
Rifting began in the Late Cretaceous as a result of tectonic extension (stretching and thinning of the crust and mantle) in approximately an east–west orientation, by plate tectonics processes. The extension within the Ross Embayment occurred over four time periods and totals 500 kilometers or more, mostly before the late Miocene. The first phase happened in the east near Marie Byrd Land before the Campbell Plateau of Zealandia broke away from Antarctica in the Late Cretaceous.

A second phase during the Late Cretaceous and Paleocene extended the central areas of the embayment. This extension was at least 130 kilometers.

A third phase is related to 170–180 kilometers of Eocene and Oligocene seafloor spreading in the western parts of the embayment on the Adare Trough or basin in the deep-sea. This episode of sea floor spreading created the ocean crust that now underlies much of the Northern Basin. This phase also resulted in extension of the Victoria Land Basin (95 km).

A small amount of extension (~7 kilometers) occurred in the Adare basin and Victoria Land Basin (10-15 kilometers) in a fourth phase during Miocene time. Displacement including minor extension in the western WARS and Ross Embayment computed from reconstruction of oceanic magnetic anomalies ended 11 million years ago.

During the Eocene to Miocene clockwise relative rotation of West Antarctica with respect to East Antarctica resulted in extension in the western Ross Embayment but contraction, in Marie Byrd Land of West Antarctica. Subsidence to form the present topography of the embayment continued through the Cenozoic as the extended crust and mantle under the Ross Embayment cooled. Faulting within the Terror Rift, located in the Victoria Land Basin, continued after 11 Ma, and probably into or through Quaternary time.

Although most rifts within the West Antarctic Rift System are no longer active, geodetic surveys show that West Antarctica is moving away from East Antarctica in a north/northeasterly direction (approximately in the direction of the South Georgia Islands) at a rate of not greater than 1-2 millimetres per year (0.079 in/year) or 500,000 years per kilometre (800,000 years per mile).

The West Antarctic Rift System is the source of all the recently active volcanoes within Antarctica and all the recently active volcanoes on the continent. It is responsible for most of the major mountain systems outside the Antarctic Peninsula. Volcanism has been attributed to the rifting and also a mantle hotspot.

== Glaciology ==
The WARS is also believed to have a major influence on ice flows in West Antarctica. In western Marie Byrd Land active glaciers flow through fault-bounded valleys (grabens) of the WARS. Sub-ice volcanism has been detected and proposed to influence ice flow. Fast-moving ice streams in the Siple Coast adjacent to the east edge of the Ross Ice Shelf are influenced by the lubrication provided by water-saturated till within fault-bounded grabens within the rift, which could cause rapid breakup of the ice sheet if global warming accelerates.
