= Navy Arctic Service Medal =

- Navy Arctic Service Medal
- Type: Military medal Service medal
- Presented by: the Department of the Navy
- Ribbon

- Reverse
- Status: Current

Precedence
- Next (higher): Sea Service Deployment Ribbon
- Equivalent: Coast Guard Arctic Service Medal
- Next (lower): Navy Reserve: Navy Reserve Sea Service Ribbon; Naval Service: Navy and Marine Corps Overseas Service Ribbon

The Navy Arctic Service Medal is a decoration of the United States Navy which was established in May 1986 and subsequently upgraded to a medal in 2024. The Medal is authorized to any member of the U.S. Navy or United States Marine Corps for service above the Arctic Circle. Like the Antarctica Service Medal, it may also be awarded to civilians and members of other U.S. services.

== History ==
The medal was made retroactive to January 1982 and is also granted to members of other branches of the military, providing they are serving with a Navy or Marine Corps command when the Arctic duty was performed. The United States Coast Guard equivalent of the Arctic Service Ribbon is the Coast Guard Arctic Service Medal. On March 18, 2024, the Department of the Navy announced the establishment of the Navy Arctic Service Medal via Naval Message ALNAV 026/24.

== Criteria ==
Awarded to officers and enlisted personnel or civilians to units for twenty-eight days, consecutive or non-consecutive, above the Arctic Circle after 1 January 1982 who conducted an ice-covered strait transit, a transit to the North Pole, assigned to a submarine that conducted a vertical surfacing through the ice, assigned to a submarine that conducted a seven-day or more classified operation under the ice pack, or assigned to an ice camp or operations center. For personnel working at remote ice camps or divers working under the ice, each day of duty will count as two days when determining award eligibility. No more than one day of credit can be counted for flights in or out during any 24-hour period. Marine Corps personnel undergoing annual cold weather training above the Arctic Circle do not qualify for 2 for 1 credit. The ribbon is issued for one time service only and there are no devices authorized for additional periods of Arctic service. The Antarctic equivalent of the Arctic Service Medal is the Antarctica Service Medal. The Medal is worn after the Sea Service Deployment Ribbon, and before the Navy Reserve Sea Service Ribbon for Navy personnel. For Marine Corps personnel it is worn before the Navy and Marine Corps Overseas Service Ribbon.

== Design ==
Designed by the crew of the USS HARTFORD (SSN 768) during ICEX 2018 to recognize the unique sacrifices and circumstances involved in operating under ice for prolonged periods beyond those experienced by crews operating in arctic areas.

== See also ==
- Awards and decorations of the United States military
