= Kelly Jemison =

American geologist

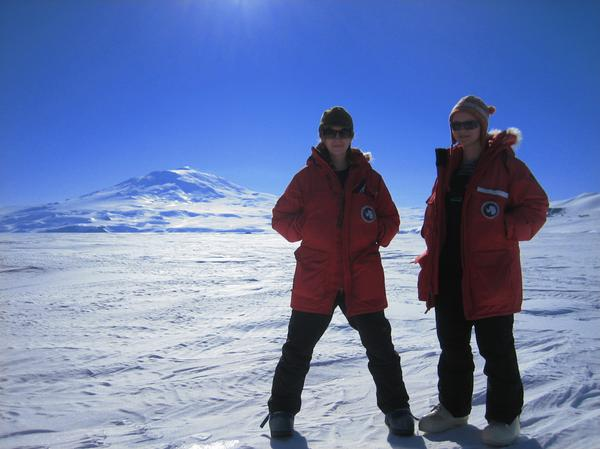
Kelly Jemison (left) and Charlie King (right) stand at the base of Mt. Erebus, Antarctic (2006).

Kelly Jemison is an American academic geologist specializing in Antarctic diatoms. She studied at Florida State University, participated in the ANDRILL (Antarctic Geological Drilling) Project, and in 2011 was awarded the Antarctica Service Medal. She currently works as a Geologist for Bureau of Ocean Energy Management in Anchorage, Alaska.

== Education ==
She attended Florida State University from 2003-2012 acquiring a Bachelors of Science Degree in Geology in April 2007. She then acquired a Masters of Science Degree in Geology studying microfossils in August 2012.

== Career ==
Jemison worked as a Laboratory assistant in from May 2005 to December 2007 for the Florida State University National Antarctic Marine Geology Research Facility. She worked on core descriptions and sampling, data entry, core imaging and scanning.

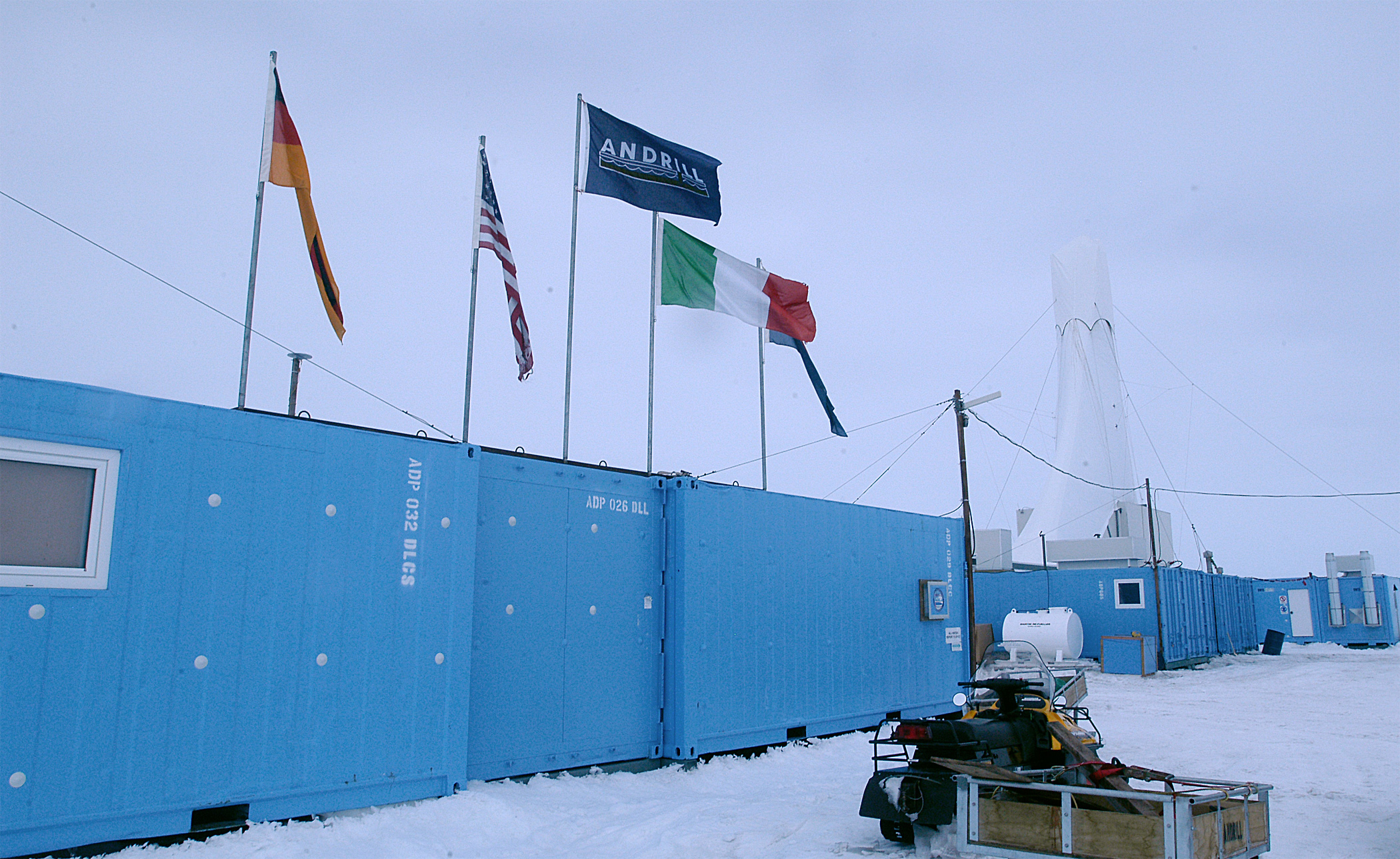
ANDRILL drill site, flags of participating nations: Germany, Italy, and the United States on display. New Zealead researchers were also involved.

From October 2006 to January 2007 Jemison took part in the ANDRILL (ANtarctic geologic DRILLing) project. A project meant to drill into Antarctic ice on the McMurdo Ice Shelf to determine past Antarctic's climate. She was one of two undergraduate students from Florida State University in a group of 6 researchers. She was an assistant to the curators Matt Olney and Matt Curren. Accompanied by visiting post-doctorate fellow Davide Perisco, graduate student Steve Petrushak, and companion undergraduate student Charlie King. Jemison and her curatorial teams goal was to transport drill sediment cores from the drill site to McMurdo Station then split, photograph, maintain, and prepare them for safe travel back to the FSU research facility. The trip was reported as "a wonderful success".

After her work in Antarctica Jemison returned to Florida State University and in 2009 became a teaching assistant in the Department of Earth, Ocean, and Atmospheric sciences. She assisted multiple classes, prepared and graded coursework.

In May 2011 she began the position of Intern Geologist at Bureau of Ocean Energy Management. Then in May 2012, she earned a position of Geologist for Department of the Interior, BEOM. In November 2016, she transitioned again to the role of Supervisory Minerals Leasing Specialist at BEOM. Until 2016 when she commenced again as a Geologist for BEOM in New Orleans. Finally she transferred to the position of geologist in Anchorage, Alaska for the BEOM where she currently resides.

== Publications ==
- Bohaty, Steven M.; Kulhanek, Denise K.; Wise, Sherwood W.; Jemison, Kelly; Warny, Sophie; Sjunneskog, Charlotte (2011). Anderson, John B.; Wellner, Julia S. (eds.). Tectonic, Climatic, and Cryospheric Evolution of the Antarctic Peninsula. American Geophysical Union. pp. 63–113. doi:10.1029/2010sp001049. ISBN 9781118667668.
- "Biostratigraphy and Paleoecology of the Calvert Formation, Eastern Maryland". 2012.

== Contributions ==
- Currently affiliated with the Bureau of Ocean Energy Management (BOEM), a government department of the United States conducting geological and geophysical analysis of regions around Alaska's outer-continental shelf (OCS) region. The data gained is then used to make present federal regulation and terms for companies pursuant on leasing. Her current post in Anchorage is still residing in BOEM's Alaskan region efforts.

This distinction; awarded by the United States Government, recognizes both military service personnel and civilians that served in Antarctica either for research or defense purposes benefitting the United States of America. Those in service at measurements of 60 degrees South latitude in endeavors and equally as civilian participants may also qualify.

== Accomplishments and awards ==
- Awarded the Antarctica Service Medal in 2011.
- Geologist at Bureau of Ocean Energy Management since May 2011 - New Orleans, Louisiana, Anchorage Alaska
- Education: Florida State University: Graduate Teaching Assistant August 2009-May 2011
- Antarctic Marine Geology Research Facility-Florida State University 2005-2007
- Florida State University MS Geology and Earth Science 2003-2012

== Awards ==
The Antarctica Service Medal; awarded by the United States Government. This distinction recognizes both military service personnel and civilians that served in Antarctica either for research or defense purposes benefitting the United States of America. Those in service at measurements of 60 degrees South latitude in endeavors and equally as civilian participants may also qualify.
