= Julie Parsonnet =

American infectious disease expert

- Born: New Jersey, US
- Spouse(s): Anthony Alfrey (m. 1993; died 2015) Dean Winslow

Academic background
- Education: Harvard University (BA); Weill Cornell Medicine (MD)
- Thesis: John Dewey and social pragmatism in China (1979)
- Website: eaglefundtrust.org

Julie Parsonnet is an infectious disease expert. She is a Fellow of the National Academy of Medicine and American Society for Clinical Investigation.

== Early life and education ==
Parsonnet grew up in Millburn, New Jersey, alongside father Victor Parsonnet and attended Millburn High School. Following high school, she graduated magna cum laude from Harvard University with a bachelor's degree in history and science. As a sophomore at Harvard, she spent a summer as an intern with Senator Clifford P. Case.

Following Harvard, Parsonnet enrolled at Cornell University for her medical degree. Upon graduating in 1983, she had received the John Metcalf Polk Prize for General Efficiency as a student with the highest academic standing over four years, the Clarence C. Coryell Prize in Medicine for having the highest average in medicine through the junior year, the Alfred Moritz Michaelis Prize Endowment for Efficiency in General Medicine, and the American Medical Women's Association Scholarship Citation. Following Cornell, Parsonnet completed her residency and fellowship at Massachusetts General Hospital from 1984 until 1989.

== Career ==
Upon completing her formal education, Parsonnet accepted an assistant professor position at Stanford University School of Medicine. In 1991, she received a 2-year, $60,000 grant from the Infectious Diseases Society of America to support her research into a possible association of gastrointestinal infection by the bacterium Helicobacter pylori, with the onset of gastric cancer. As a result of her work, she was elected a Member of the American Society for Clinical Investigation in 1998. Parsonnet married Anthony Alfrey in 1993 and they had one daughter together.

Alongside her new husband Dean Winslow, they created The Eagle Fund of the Silicon Valley Community Foundation in 2015 to provides aid to middle eastern and central American refugees. A few years later, Parsonnet was elected to the National Academy of Medicine for "elucidating how infectious agents cause chronic disease and research on H. pylori’s roles in malignancy and in modulating host immunity that are widely cited in the field of gastric cancer."
