= Michael Julian Drake =

American planetary scientist (1946–2011)

- Born: July 8, 1946; Bristol, England
- Died: September 21, 2011 (aged 65); Tucson, Arizona, U.S.
- Education: Victoria University of Manchester; University of Oregon
- Scientific career
- Fields: Geology; Planetary Sciences; Management
- Workplaces: University of Arizona; Lunar and Planetary Laboratory
- Doctoral students: Nancy Chabot

Michael Julian Drake (July 8, 1946 – September 21, 2011) was the director of the University of Arizona's Lunar and Planetary Laboratory (LPL) and head of the Department of Planetary Science. He was the principal investigator of the Origins Spectral Interpretation Resource Identification Security Regolith Explorer (OSIRIS-REx) mission of NASA's New Frontiers Program. The OSIRIS-REx mission, launching on September 8, 2016, and arriving at Asteroid Bennu in December 2018, was the most ambitious University of Arizona planetary science project to date and successfully retrieved a sample of the asteroid and returned it to Earth. Drake also made significant contributions to the study of HED meteorites and studied the origin of water in terrestrial planets.

== Education ==
Drake earned his B.S. degree in geology with honors from Victoria University of Manchester in Manchester, England in 1967 and earned his Ph.D. in geology from the University of Oregon in 1972.

== Career ==
Drake joined the University of Arizona planetary sciences faculty as an assistant professor in 1973. He served as the associate director of the Lunar and Planetary Laboratory from 1978 through 1980 and was an associate professor of planetary sciences from 1978 through 1983. In 1986 and 1987, he was the Associate Dean of Science, and in 1994 he became the head of the Department of Planetary Sciences and the Director of the Lunar and Planetary Laboratory in 1994. He served in that capacity until his death in 2011.

In addition to his academic and scientific achievements, Drake was an accomplished administrator. He helped develop promotion and tenure policies for the College of Science and was instrumental in establishing a joint position between the colleges of science and education to create science education programs. Drake also led a major undergraduate teaching effort in planetary sciences, even though the department was created as a graduate program.

Drake played a key role in a succession of many high-profile space projects that garnered international attention for LPL and the university. Those include the Cassini mission to explore Saturn, the Gamma-Ray Spectrometer onboard NASA's Mars Odyssey Orbiter, the HiRISE camera onboard NASA's Mars Reconnaissance Orbiter, and the Phoenix Mars lander.

Drake had over 100 peer-reviewed scientific papers published in his career.

== Awards and honors ==
Drake received a number of awards and honors during his career, including the College of Science Career Distinguished Teaching Award, Aviation Week and Space Technology 2001 Laurels Award for Outstanding Achievement in Space, Leonard Medal of the Meteoritical Society, and the University of Arizona Senior Honorary Bobcats Outstanding Faculty Member Award in 2006. Asteroid (9022) 1988 PC1 was named Drake in his honor by Carolyn S. Shoemaker.

== Personal life and death ==
Drake married Gail Georgenson, who survived him. They had two children.

Drake was diagnosed with liver cancer, and had a transplant operation, during the last two years of his life, while actively pursuing NASA funding approval of OSIRIS-REx. He tracked the project's progress “To his last breath.”
