= Nancy Chabot =

Planetary scientist

- Born: 1972 (age 53–54)
- Education: Rice University; University of Arizona
- Scientific career
- Fields: Planetary science Physics
- Workplaces: Johns Hopkins University Applied Physics Laboratory; Case Western Reserve University; NASA
- Thesis: Geochemical studies of the cores of terrestrial planetary bodies (1999)
- Doctoral advisor: Michael J. Drake

Nancy Chabot (born 1972) is a planetary scientist at the Johns Hopkins University Applied Physics Laboratory.

== Career ==
Nancy Chabot earned her B.A. in physics from Rice University in 1994. After earning her Ph.D. in planetary science from the University of Arizona in 1999, Chabot worked at the Johnson Space Center in Houston, then at Case Western Reserve University in Cleveland. She joined the Applied Physics Laboratory at Johns Hopkins University in 2005.

She has been a member of five field teams that traveled to Antarctica with the Antarctic Search for Meteorites (ANSMET) program to collect meteorites. In 2001, Chabot was awarded the United States Antarctic Service Medal.

On NASA's MESSENGER mission, she served as the Instrument Scientist for the Mercury Dual Imaging System (MDIS) and the Chair of the Geology Discipline Group. She was the lead for MDIS-based scientific investigations of Mercury's polar, radar-bright, ice-bearing craters and led the release of web images since MESSENGER's first flyby of Mercury in January 2008.

Currently, she is the Deputy PI for the Mars-moon Exploration with GAmma rays and NEutrons (MEGANE) instrument on the JAXA Martian Moons eXploration (MMX) mission.

She is also the Coordination Lead on NASA's Double Asteroid Redirection Test (DART) mission, which was led by APL.

She is a Fellow of the Meteoritical Society, and Asteroid (6899) Nancychabot is named in her honor.
