= Mount Luyendyk =

Mountain in Marie Byrd Land, Antarctica

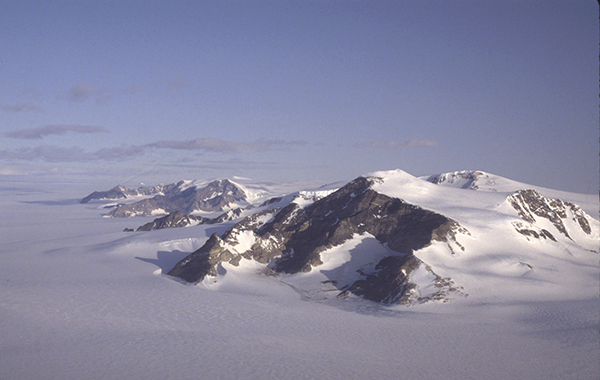
- Fosdick Mountains, Marie Byrd Land

Highest point
- Elevation: 1,070 m (3,510 ft)Wade, F. A., et al., 1977. Reconnaissance geologic map of the Guest Peninsula quadrangle, Marie Byrd Land, Antarctica, Map A-7. Reston, VA: U. S. Antarctic Research Program.
- Coordinates: 76.4888889°S 146.0269444°W

Geography
- Location: Ford Ranges, Marie Byrd Land, West Antarctica
- Parent range: Fosdick Mountains

Climbing
- First ascent: December 25, 1989: Alasdair Cain, David Kimbrough, Steve Richard, Christine Siddoway

Mount Luyendyk is a summit in the western Fosdick Mountains of the Ford Ranges of Marie Byrd Land, West Antarctica. It forms a prominent exposure in the northwestern Iphigene massif. The peak is named in recognition of Professor Bruce P. Luyendyk of the University of California, Santa Barbara, who was active in ground- and ocean-based Antarctic research from 1989 to 2015, significantly advancing the scientific knowledge of the Ross Embayment region of Antarctica. Luyendyk led two on-land expeditions in the Ford Ranges, and was principal investigator for five marine geophysical expeditions in the Ross Sea.

In December, 1989, geologists of the UC Santa Barbara FORCE expedition traveled by snowmobile-sledge to Mt. Luyendyk, for the purpose of sampling for rock magnetism, petrology, and geochronology studies. Between 2005 and 2012, geologists from Colorado College, University of Maryland, and Curtin University (Perth) returned to Mt. Luyendyk for structural geology and petrology investigations.

== Geology ==
Mt. Luyendyk consists of migmatite gneiss and plutonic rocks within the Fosdick Mountains gneiss dome/core complex. The rocks constitute an exposure of the middle crust that was exhumed approximately 100 million years ago, during the Cretaceous Period, by action on the Fosdick Mountains detachment fault.

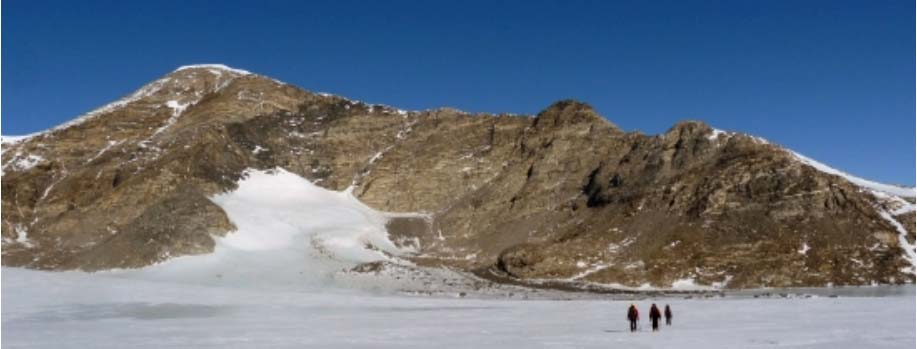
View to southeast of Mt. Luyendyk, a summit in the western Fosdick Mountains, Antarctica. Geologists are visible, approaching the base of the mountain. The summit is named for Bruce P. Luyendyk, professor (emeritus), University of California - Santa Barbara, in recognition of his contributions and discoveries in ground- and ocean-based Antarctic research, 1989-2015
