= Lindley Winslow =

Experimental nuclear and particle physicist

Prof Lindley Winslow
- Education: University of California at Berkeley
- Scientific career
- Fields: Nuclear physics, particle physics
- Workplaces: MIT, University of California, Los Angeles
- Thesis: (2008)
- Website: physics.mit.edu/faculty/lindley-winslow/

Lindley Winslow is an experimental nuclear and particle physicist, and associate professor at MIT.

== Biography ==
Winslow grew up in Chadds Ford, Pennsylvania.

Winslow completed her BA in physics in 2001 and her PhD in 2008 at University of California at Berkeley, before doing a postdoc at MIT. She was an assistant professor at University of California, Los Angeles before moving back to MIT in 2015, where she works on the search for dark matter.

In 2016, Winslow was consulted on the equations in the Ghostbusters reboot film.

In 2018, Winslow established a grant programme especially for women physicists.

== Awards and honours ==
- 2021 – Fellow of the American Physical Society for "leadership in the search for axion-like particles that may be dark matter candidates, and for the establishment of the groundbreaking ABRACADABRA detector for this search, and also for valuable detector development for the field of neutrinoless double beta decay."
- 2016 – UCLA Hellman Fellow
- 2011 – Michelson Postdoctoral Prize Lectureship
- 2010 – L'Oreal USA Fellowship For Women in Science

== Selected publications ==
- Ouellet, Jonathan L.; Salemi, Chiara P.; Foster, Joshua W.; Henning, Reyco; Bogorad, Zachary; Conrad, Janet M.; Formaggio, Joseph A.; Kahn, Yonatan; Minervini, Joe; Radovinsky, Alexey; Rodd, Nicholas L.; Safdi, Benjamin R.; Thaler, Jesse; Winklehner, Daniel; Winslow, Lindley (29 March 2019). "Design and implementation of the ABRACADABRA-10 cm axion dark matter search". Physical Review D. 99 (5) 052012. arXiv:1901.10652. Bibcode:2019PhRvD..99e2012O. doi:10.1103/PhysRevD.99.052012.
- Gruszko, J.; Naranjo, B.; Daniel, B.; Elagin, A.; Gooding, D.; Grant, C.; Ouellet, J.; Winslow, L. (6 February 2019). "Detecting Cherenkov light from 1–2 MeV electrons in linear alkylbenzene". Journal of Instrumentation. 14 (2) P02005. arXiv:1811.11144. Bibcode:2019JInst..14P2005G. doi:10.1088/1748-0221/14/02/P02005. S2CID 118996436.
- Lindley Winslow; Jesse Thaler (2019). "Listening for Dark Matter" (PDF). MIT Physics Annual.
