= Cape Christian =

Cape in Nunavut, Canada

Coordinates: 70.517°N 68.280°W

Cape Christian is a land point on eastern Baffin Island, in Qikiqtaaluk Region, Nunavut, Canada. The nearest settlement is Clyde River to the north. Cape Christian was used as a weather station. From 1954 until 1974, it was also an Arctic military site that was run by the U.S. Coast Guard as a LORAN station which supported ships and aircraft that operated out of Thule Air Base, Greenland.

The climate is tundra. The average temperature is −13 °C. The warmest month is July, at 8 °C, and the coldest is January, at −25 °C.
