= Antarctica Service Medal =

American Service medal

- Obverse and reverse
- Type: Military medal Service medal
- Awarded for: Service in Antarctica (see § Criteria).
- Presented by: Department of Defense; National Science Foundation
- Status: Currently awarded
- Established: Pub.L. 86−600, 74 Stat. 337, enacted July 7, 1960
- First award: 1960 (retroactive to January 2, 1946)
- Service ribbon

Precedence
- Next (higher): Korean Service Medal
- Equivalent: Army: Arctic Tab; Naval Service: Navy Arctic Service Ribbon; Air and Space Forces: Air and Space Overseas Short Tour Service Ribbon with Arctic "A" Device; Coast Guard: Coast Guard Arctic Service Medal
- Next (lower): Armed Forces Expeditionary Medal

The Antarctica Service Medal (ASM) was established by the United States Congress on July 7, 1960, under Public Law 600 of the 86th Congress. The medal was intended as a military award to replace several commemorative awards which had been issued for previous Antarctica expeditions from 1928 to 1941. With the creation of the Antarctica Service Medal, the following commemorative medals were declared obsolete;

- Byrd Antarctic Expedition Medal
- Second Byrd Antarctic Expedition Medal
- United States Antarctic Expedition Medal

The Antarctica Service Medal is considered an award of the United States Armed Forces, issued in the name of the U.S. Department of Defense, and is authorized for wear on active duty uniforms. The medal may also be awarded to U.S. civilians and citizens of foreign nations who participate in a U.S. Antarctic expedition on the continent at the invitation of a participating U.S. agency (for example, National Science Foundation).

The Arctic equivalents of the Antarctica Service Medal are the Army Arctic Tab, Navy Arctic Service Ribbon, the Coast Guard Arctic Service Medal and the Air Force Overseas Short Tour Service Ribbon with Arctic "A" Device.

== Criteria ==
To qualify for the Antarctica Service Medal, personnel must train or serve ten days stationed on the Antarctic continent, or aboard vessels in Antarctic waters, defined as south of 60 degrees latitude. Flight crews performing transport missions to Antarctica qualify for one day of service for each flight mission performed within a 24-hour time period. Civilians who work in a research facility or on a research vessel are also eligible to receive the Antarctica Service Medal through the National Science Foundation, provided that they also remain south of 60 degrees latitude for a cumulative period of 10 days, or 30 days if prior to October 10, 2008.

== Appearance ==
The award is issued as a bronze medal, 1 1/4 inches in diameter. Its obverse consists of a polar landscape view and standing figure in Antarctica clothing facing to the front between the horizontally placed words, "ANTARCTICA" on the figure's left and "SERVICE" on the figure's right.

On its reverse is a polar projection with geodesic lines of the continent of Antarctica across which are the horizontally placed words "COURAGE", "SACRIFICE", and "DEVOTION", all within a circular decorative border of penguins and marine life.

The service ribbon is 1 3/8 inches wide and consists of a 3/16-inch black stripe on each edge and graded from a white stripe in the center to a pale blue, light blue, greenish blue, and medium blue. The outer bands of black and dark blue represent five months of Antarctic darkness; the center portion, by its size and colors – grading from medium blue through light blue and pale blue to white – symbolizes seven months of solar illumination, and also the aurora australis.

== Devices ==
Wintered Over Devices
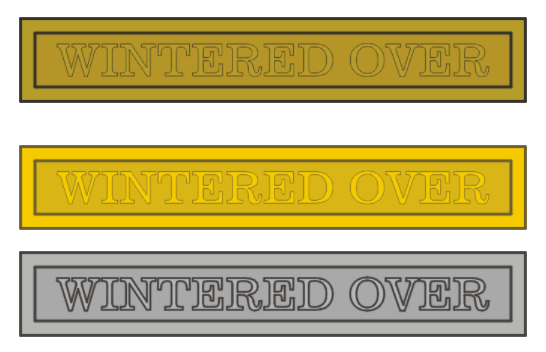
- Wintered Over Medal Clasps
- Type: Ribbon Device
- Awarded for: Spending a winter in Antarctica
- Sponsored by: Department of Defense; National Science Foundation
- Established: July 7, 1960
- Wintered Over Disc for 1, 2 and 3 winters

For those personnel performing extended winter service in Antarctica, a "Wintered Over" device is authorized. The "Wintered Over" bar is only worn on the full-size medal's suspension ribbon. The smaller "disc" device is worn on the uniform ribbon to recognize this service.

The Wintered Over device is bestowed to indicate the number of winters served on the Antarctica continent. The device is worn as a disk on the award ribbon and is issued in bronze for one winter service, gold for two, and silver for three or more winters of service. On the full-sized medal a clasp is worn, issued in the same degree, inscribed with the words "Wintered Over".

== Partial list of notable recipients ==
- Delbert Black
- Fredrik Th. Bolin
- Eugene L. Boudette
- Erroll M. Brown
- William A. Cassidy
- Nancy Chabot
- Richard H. Cruzen
- Bill Curtsinger
- Robert L. Dale
- Merton Davies
- David Drewry
- Howell M. Estes II
- Linda L. Fagan
- Joseph D. Healy
- Kelly Jemison
- Christina Koch
- Otto Ludwig Lange
- Wesley L. McDonald
- Michelle Rogan-Finnemore
- Christine Siddoway
- Sean Spicer
- Martin Sponholz
- Paul Tasch
- Carlisle Trost
- Dean Winslow
- Igor Zotikov

== See also ==
- United States military award devices
