= Ross Embayment =

Region of Antarctica

Map of Antarctica showing outline of Ross Embayment

The Ross Embayment is a large region of Antarctica, comprising the Ross Ice Shelf and the Ross Sea, that lies between East and West Antarctica.

== Extent ==
The continent of Antarctica has two major divisions; West Antarctica in mostly western longitudes and East Antarctica in mostly eastern longitudes. East Antarctica is the larger and has a higher average elevation. Separating the two subcontinents is a lower elevation topographic region occupied by the Ross Ice Shelf and the Ross Sea. This region is referred to as the Ross Embayment. The embayment comprises an area of approximately 1,137,000 square kilometres (439,000 sq mi). It includes the Ross Sea (637,000 square kilometres (246,000 sq mi)) and the Ross Ice Shelf (as of 2013, 500,809 square kilometres (193,363 sq mi)). The name is most commonly used in the scientific literature, at times along with the West Antarctic Rift System, which is of larger extent and has geologic meaning. Because the rift system includes the embayment, the latter is considered to lie in West Antarctica.

The informal use of the name 'Ross Embayment' tends to denote a smaller region than the rift system. The embayment extends from Northern Victoria Land and the Transantarctic Mountains on the west (in East Antarctica) to the Edward VII Peninsula, Shirase Coast, and Siple Coast on the east (Marie Byrd Land in West Antarctica), and south to the grounding line of the Ross Ice Shelf.

=== Formation ===
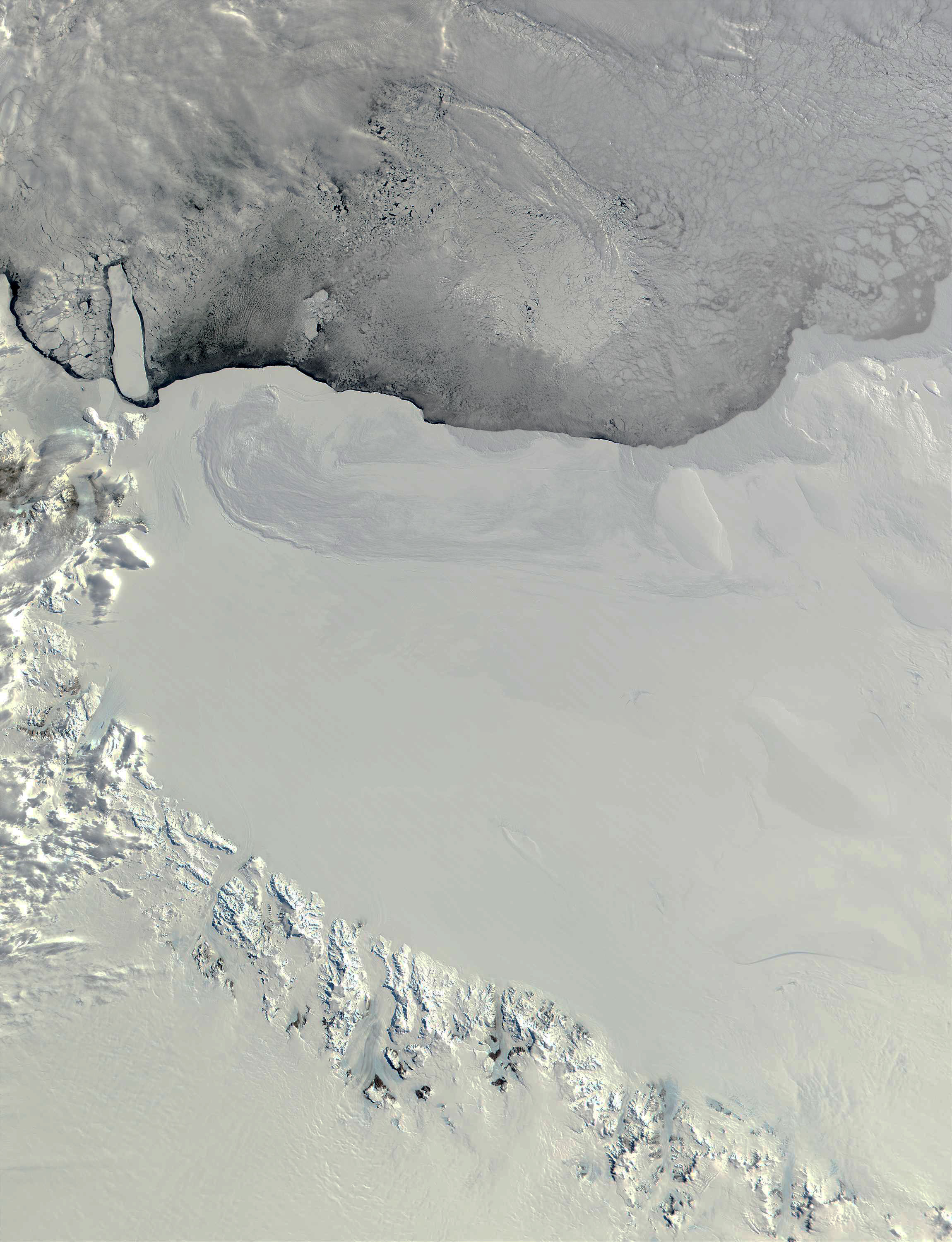
A view of the Ross Ice Shelf and Ross Sea in Antarctica from the Moderate Resolution Imaging Spectroradiometer (MODIS). North at top. A giant iceberg on the left (west) has broken off the front of the Ross Ice Shelf. The Transantarctic Mountains cross the image from left to lower right. Original file from Commons was image-enhanced.

The low elevation marine characteristic of the Ross Embayment formed since the Jurassic period. Before that time and earlier East and West Antarctica had similar elevations and the Ross Embayment did not exist. The breakup of the eastern sector of Gondwana in Cretaceous time resulted in crustal extension, thinning and subsidence to form the Ross Embayment. The mechanism of crustal stretching and subsidence in the Ross Embayment has been attributed to detachment faulting. Extension between East and West Antarctica totals about 500 kilometers. Half of this occurred prior to sea floor spreading that separated the New Zealand microcontinents (Zealandia) from Antarctica beginning at 85 million years. The remaining extension occurred in the Central Trough, Northern Basin, and Victoria Land Basin in the western Ross Sea before late Miocene time. Subsidence continued as mantle under the Ross Embayment cooled.

== See also ==
- Ross Island
- McMurdo Station
- Scott Base
- Roosevelt Island, Antarctica
- Iceberg B-15
- Iceberg C-19
