= Intermediate-depth earthquake =

Earthquakes occurring 70 to 300 kilometers deep

An intermediate-depth earthquake or intermediate-focus earthquake is an earthquake whose focal depth is in the range 70 km to 300 km. Such events are associated with subduction zones, and are caused by faulting within the downgoing slab, forming part of Wadati-Benioff zones of seismicity.

== Occurrence ==
Intermediate-depth earthquakes are found globally in subduction zones, at depths beneath the zone where the subducting plate is mechanically coupled to the overriding plate. In these shallower parts, in places where the plates are at least partly coupled, seismicity is dominated by ruptures along the plate interface, although intraplate earthquakes do occur, particularly within the outer rise.

The analysis of observed focal mechanisms of these earthquakes has identified four types of event. Type 1 are normal faulting events (44%), type 2 reverse faulting (33%) (in both cases occurring along fault planes that strike near parallel to the trend of the subduction zone). Type 3 (10%) (both normal and reverse) occur on fault planes significantly oblique to the subduction zone, with 13% indicating tear faulting.

The number of intermediate-depth earthquakes in a subduction zone decreases exponentially with depth down to about 300 km. Beyond 300 km, the frequency start to increase again, which is why this depth has been used as the boundary between intermediate and deep focus earthquakes.

== Causes ==
A subducting plate is affected by a number of stress changes that explain the observed earthquake occurrence. Before the plate enters the subduction zone it bends, forming the outer trench swell. This bending leads to significant normal faulting in the outer (upper) part of the bend and some reverse faulting in the inner (lower) part. The normal faults form horst and graben structures that may become reactivated, as subduction continues. At greater depths, the slab unbends and finally is affected by forces acting along the slab, resulting from slab pull. These stresses give rise to type 1 and 2 earthquakes. In some subduction zones, the slab becomes contorted, leading to tensional or compressional stresses within the slab, providing a cause for type 3 earthquakes. Tear faulting within a subducting slab is thought to be a result of major changes in slab dip along strike in a subduction zone, producing vertical tears trending near perpendicular to the trench.

== Mechanism ==
Fault rupture at intermediate depths is not consistent with normal mechanisms of brittle faulting, as the confining pressure would be expected to suppress brittle behaviour completely. However, focal mechanisms of these events are consistent with a "double-couple", indicating that faulting processes at these depths are similar to those at shallower levels. The two main proposed mechanisms involve either an increase in fluid pressure, due to the dehydration of hydrous minerals such as those in the serpentine subgroup, offsetting the confining pressure and allowing faulting to occur, or the development of ductile instabilities caused by shear heating due to creep leading to self-localizing thermal runaway.
