= USS Mobjack =

Tender of the United States Navy

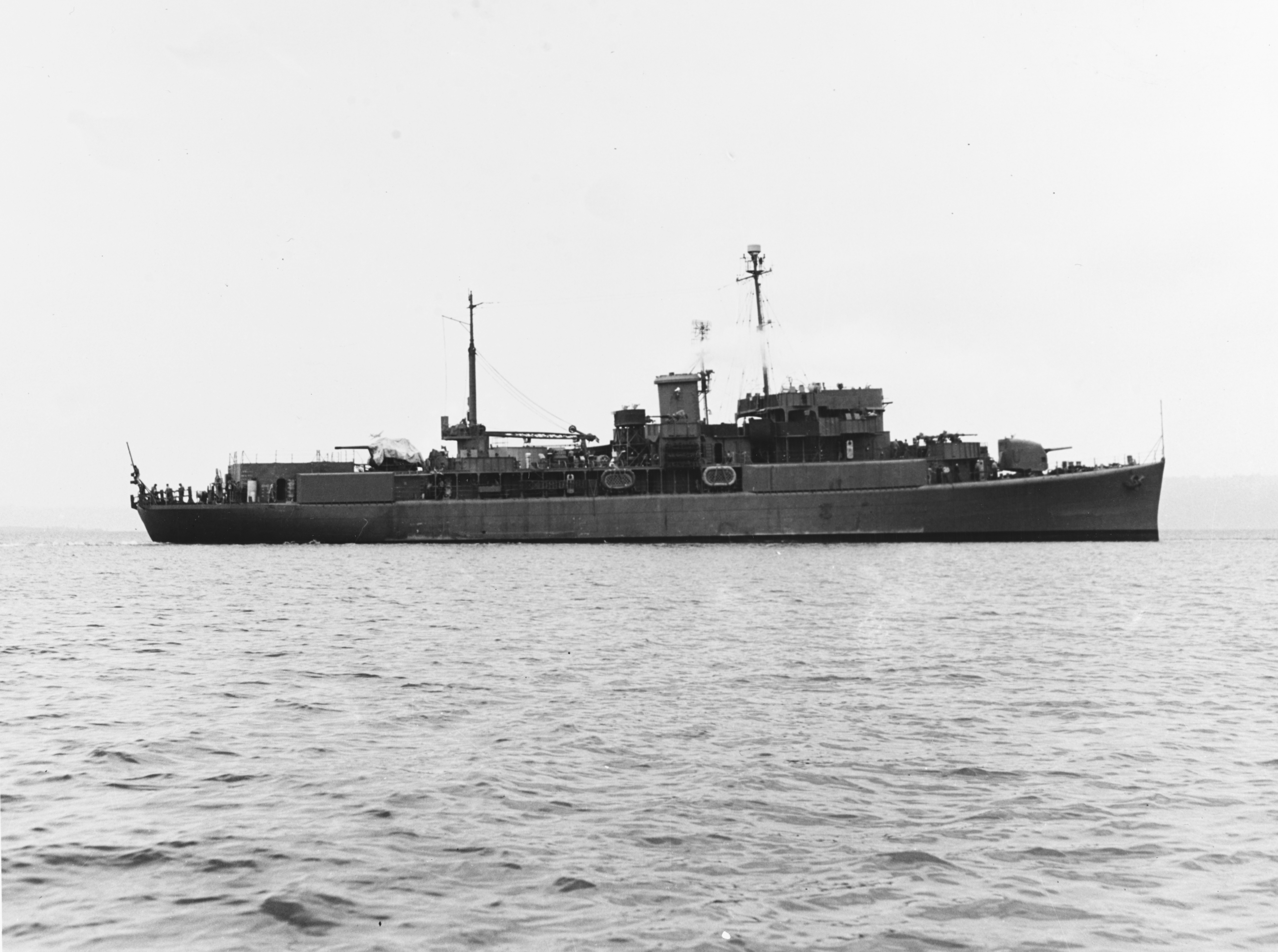
- USS Mobjack (AGP-7) off Houghton, Washington, on her commissioning day, 17 September 1943

History

United States Navy
- Name: Mobjack (AVP-27)
- Namesake: Mobjack Bay, on the western shore of Chesapeake Bay in Virginia
- Builder: Lake Washington Shipyard, Houghton, Washington
- Laid down: 25 February 1942
- Launched: 2 August 1942
- Sponsored by: Mrs. H. R. Peck
- Reclassified: Motor torpedo boat tender (AGP-7) 11 March 1943
- Commissioned: 17 October 1943
- Decommissioned: 21 August 1946
- Honors and awards: Three battle stars for her World War II service
- Fate: Transferred to U.S. Department of Commerce 21 August 1946

General characteristics (Seaplane tender)
- Class & type: Barnegat-class seaplane tender, converted during construction into a motor torpedo boat tender
- Displacement: 1,760 tons (light); 2,750 tons (full load)
- Length: 310 ft 9 in (94.72 m)
- Beam: 41 ft 1 in (12.52 m)
- Draft: 13 ft 6 in (4.11 m)
- Installed power: 6,000 horsepower (4.48 megawatts)
- Propulsion: Four diesel engines, two shafts
- Speed: 18.2 knots
- Complement: 360
- Sensors & processing systems: Radar; sonar
- Armament: 2 × 5 in (130 mm) guns; 8 × 40 mm anti-aircraft guns; 2 × depth charge tracks
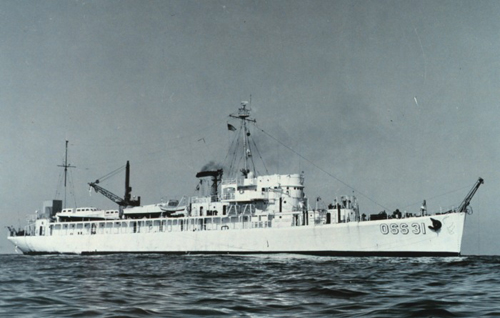
- USC&GS Pioneer (OSS 31) in 1946.

U.S. Coast and Geodetic Survey
- Name: Pioneer (OSS 31)
- Namesake: Pioneer, one who goes before, as into the wilderness, preparing the way for others to follow
- Acquired: 21 August 1946
- In service: by April 1947
- Out of service: by May 1966
- Fate: Sold for scrapping 4 May 1966

General characteristics (Survey ship)
- Type: Ocean survey ship
- Length: 311.6 ft (95.0 m)
- Beam: 41 ft (12 m)
- Draft: 13.8 ft (4.2 m)

USS Mobjack (AVP-27/AGP-7) was a motor torpedo boat tender in commission in the United States Navy from 1943 to 1946. She saw service in the Pacific theater during the latter portion of World War II.

After the conclusion of her Navy career, the ship served in the United States Coast and Geodetic Survey from 1946 to 1966 as the survey ship USC&GS Pioneer (OSS 31), the third Coast and Geodetic Survey ship of the name. Pioneer operated in the Pacific Ocean during her career, making an important discovery of magnetic striping on the ocean floor that made a major contribution to the development of the theory of plate tectonics. She also took part in the International Indian Ocean Expedition, becoming the first ship in the history of the U.S. Coast and Geodetic Survey to visit the Indian Ocean.

== Construction and commissioning ==
Mobjack was laid down as a seaplane tender, AVP‑27, by Lake Washington Shipyard, Houghton Washington, on 25 February 1942 and launched on 2 August 1942, sponsored by Mrs. H. R. Peck. She was reclassified as a motor torpedo boat tender and redesignated AGP‑7 on 11 March 1943 and commissioned on 17 October 1943.

== United States Navy service ==
=== World War II ===
Following shakedown off Southern California, Mobjack departed San Diego, California, for the Southwest Pacific on 14 December 1943. Steaming via New Caledonia and the New Hebrides, she arrived at Rendova, British Solomon Islands, on 14 January 1944 to begin duty with Motor Torpedo Boat Squadrons, South Pacific (SOPAC). She trained and supplied patrol torpedo boats (PT boats) in the New Georgia area until 6 March 1944, when she steamed to the Treasury Islands and thence to the motor torpedo boat base, Emirau, arriving on 23 March 1944. In mid‑May 1944 she returned to the Treasury Islands, where she overhauled PT boats and repaired and tended the motor gunboats (PGMs) and landing craft infantry gunboats (LCI(G)s) of Task Group 30.3 into July 1944.

Employed briefly in transporting spares and other materiel, she departed for British New Guinea on 23 July 1944, arriving at Dreger Harbor on 27 July 1944 to begin service under Commander, Motor Torpedo Boat Squadrons, 7th Fleet. During the greater part of August 1944 she operated at Aitape Harbor, tending Motor Torpedo Boat Squadron (MTBRBon) 33 and providing assistance in salvage work. On 28 August 1944, she got underway for Mios Woendi, Netherlands New Guinea, in company with MTBRBon 33. Arriving there on 31 August 1944, she was engaged in fueling, provisioning and making final repairs to the PT boats of the squadron preparatory to sailing for Morotai as a unit of Task Group 70.1.

==== Morotai ====
Arriving at Morotai on 16 September 1944, the day after the American landings there, she commenced tending the boats of her squadron and Consolidated PBY Catalina flying boats assigned to air-sea rescue of pilots downed en route to and from raids on Truk. For the first three days she went about her duties unscathed in spite of Japanese air resistance.

At sunrise on 19 September 1944, however, a smoking Japanese fighter emerged from a heavy overcast and dove for Mobjack. Unable to crash into the ship, the pilot dropped two bombs which exploded close alongside, holing the deck and wounding one of her crew.

Making temporary repairs, she remained at Morotai, tending PT boats of Task Unit 70.1.2 and PBYs now ranging over the Netherlands East Indies on relief and intelligence and reconnaissance missions, until February 1945.

==== The Philippines ====
During February and March 1945, Mobjack transported materiel, spares, and advanced base personnel as she accompanied motor torpedo boat squadrons to forward areas. At Mios Woendi on 1 April 1945, she took on base force personnel of MTBRons 9 and 10 and on 2 April 1945 got underway for Samar in the Philippine Islands. Arriving on 11 April 1945, she disembarked her passengers and steamed on to Palawan, where she relieved motor torpedo boat tender USS Willoughby (AGP-9) as the repair unit for MTBRons 20 and 23. She moved on to Mangarin Bay, Mindoro, in mid‑May 1945 to overhaul and repair motor torpedo boats for use in the Philippines and in the upcoming Borneo operations.

==== The Borneo campaign ====
On 8 June 1945, Mobjack steamed to Samar to stage for the landings at Balikpapan on Borneo. Departing on 21 June 1945, she moved, with MTBRons 10 and 27, to Basilan Island, thence, on 26 June 1945, further down the Sulu Archipelago and into Makassar Strait. On 27 June 1945, she joined the minesweepers, at work since 1 June 1945, and the ships of the bombardment group, which had been pounding the Japanese-held oil center since 17 June 1945, in preparing the way for the Australian assault force. For four days Mobjack fueled and sustained the motor torpedo boats assigned to night patrol off the coast to prevent the Japanese from replacing naval mines, restoring obstacles blown by underwater demolition teams, or disturbing channel markers planted by the minesweepers. On 1 July 1945, these extensive preparations and precautions proved to have been well executed as wave after wave of personnel of the Australian 7th Division of the Australian I Corps went ashore without a casualty.

Mobjack, harassed by Japanese night air attacks until Royal Australian Air Force night fighters stopped them, remained outside the harbor for the next nine days. On 11 July 1945 she stood into the harbor, where, on 15 August 1945, she received a dispatch directing the cessation of all offensive action against the Japanese. World War II was over.

==== Honors and awards ====
Mobjack received three battle stars for World War II service.

=== Post-World War II ===
On 12 September 1945, Mobjack returned to the Philippines and for the next two months engaged in decommissioning motor torpedo boats under Commander, Motor Torpedo Boat Squadrons, Philippine Sea Frontier. On 10 November 1945 she headed eastward, arriving at San Francisco, California, on 29 November 1945.

In December 1945, stripping of Mobjack began, and on 21 August 1946 she was decommissioned. The Navy transferred her the same day to the United States Department of Commerce.

== U.S. Coast and Geodetic Survey service ==
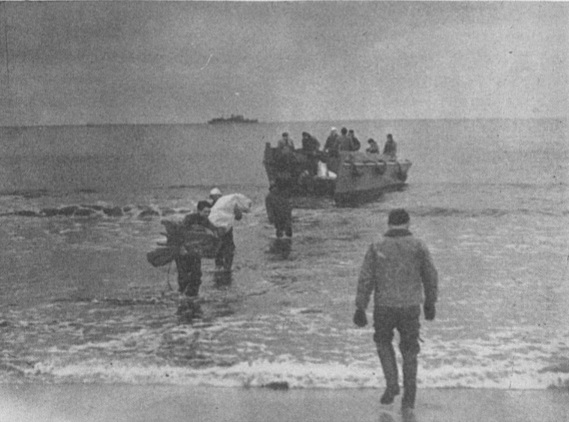
A landing party from Pioneer disembarks from a Landing Craft, Vehicle, Personnel (LCVP) (or "Higgins boat") on a beach in the Aleutian Islands, ca. 1949–1950. Pioneer is visible in the distance.

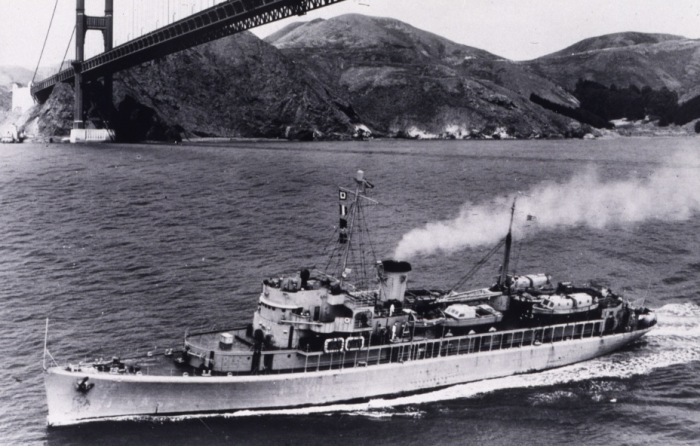
USC&GS Pioneer (OSS 31) passing under the Golden Gate Bridge ca. 1952.

After the ship underwent conversion into an "ocean survey ship" (OSS), the Department of Commerce commissioned her into service with the United States Coast and Geodetic Survey as USC&GS Pioneer (OSS 31), the third Coast and Geodetic Survey ship to bear the name.

Pioneer spent her Coast and Geodetic Survey career on duties in the Pacific Ocean.

=== Early operations ===
Pioneer departed the U.S. West Coast in April 1947 for her first assignment, which was hydrographic survey work in the Aleutian Islands. She spent the field seasons of 1947, 1948, 1949, and 1950 in the Aleutians, also running sounding lines from points in the Aleutians across the Gulf of Alaska and North Pacific Ocean to points on the U.S. West Coast.

=== Discovery of magnetic striping ===
During the 1950s, Pioneer's operations moved beyond the Aleutians into the broader Pacific Ocean, and by 1955 she was involved in a joint survey effort with the U.S. Navy. (Note: The Integrated Undersea Surveillance System (IUSS)/Caesar periodical The Cable (Spring 2006) has "Recollections on the Successful Implementation of the Portion of Brick Bat 03-Titled Project Caesar Ii-Pacific (PART 1)" by Robert Kneedler who was at the time part of the Navy management team at Commander, Western Sea Frontier. He notes that the survey was actually for the then very closely held Sound Surveillance System (the name itself then classified) installation under the very high priority (Brickbat 3) installation program given the unclassified name Project Caesar. The associations and details of SOSUS/Caesar remained classified until 1991. At the time the Navy's Hydrographic Office managed the project's survey efforts. Also under that office was Project Magnet, an aeromagnetic survey flown by specially equipped Navy aircraft. Within the same division of that organization was a shipboard magnetic data collection effort. The USC&GS was also collecting magnetic data and beginning shipboard collection in U.S. waters.) In cooperation with the Scripps Institution of Oceanography the ship towed the first marine magnetometer, developed by Victor Vacquier of Scripps, to study underwater magnetism.

Roger Revelle heard of the Pioneer survey and saw a chance to obtain data more detailed than the ocean tracks collected in other Scripps magnetic collections. Revelle proposed that Scripps provide the magnetometer and an operator, Ron G. Mason, on sabbatical at the California Institute of Technology, so that towed magnetic collection could be included in the Pioneer's collection. His initial proposal to the Navy was rejected due to the high priority of the program and difficulties with towed devices. Revelle approached John Lyman, then Director of the U.S. Navy Hydrographic Office's Division of Oceanography. Lyman took the proposal to the Hydrographer of the Navy who approved the idea under strict rules of no delays due to towing Vacquier's ASQ-3A fluxgate magnetometer and cutting the tow cable and losing the magnetometer if it interfered with the priority survey operations. Mason had previous experience with magnetic data collection on the 1952 Capricorn Expedition and was able to find a way to overcome an issue with security classification of such data by the Navy by subtracting the average signature from the observed publishing only the difference that satisfied the Navy.

In August 1955, Pioneer began the west coast survey off southern California at an east–west line spacing of 5 nmi (5.8 mi; 9.3 km) with Mason and the magnetometer aboard. The magnetometer was described by Mason as a "gimbal mounted flux gate oriented in the direction of the Earth's magnetic field by two other flux gate elements which control orienting servo motors." all was contained within a streamlined "fish" to be towed about 500 m (1,640.4 ft) behind the ship. Two other veterans of the Capricorn Expedition, . Arthur D. Raff and Maxwell Silverman, alternated aboard for the magnetic survey. The resulting magnetic intensity charts showed north–south lineations and a 875 km (472 nmi; 544 mi) lateral offset at the along the Murray fracture zone. The magnetic data revealed structural trends not evident in the undersea topography and horizontal displacements greater than any then found on continents. Mason published results of the Murray fracture zone in 1958 in the Geophysical Journal of the Royal Astronomical Society titled "A Magnetic Survey off the West Coast of the United States Between Latitudes 32° and 36° N and Longitudes 121° and 128°". Pioneer's west coast survey – which went down in history as "The Pioneer Survey" – continued with this pattern observed throughout the survey area. The stripes indicated both periodic reversals of the earth's magnetic poles and the steady creation of new rocks which spread across the sea bottom as the ocean floor moved, making a record of these changes in polarity. Mason's work aboard Pioneer with the fluxgate magnetometer thus revealed "magnetic striping" on the floor of the Pacific, the first time it had been noted anywhere and a major discovery in the development of the theory of plate tectonics.

=== Operations, 1957-1960 ===
Pioneer continued offshore hydrographic work in the Pacific Ocean off the U.S. West Coast – at one point holding an open house while in port – until 5 March 1957, when she departed San Francisco for the Territory of Hawaii, where she conducted electronic-position-indicator- (EPI-) guided basic survey operations north of the Hawaiian Islands under direction of the U.S. Navy along with two U.S. Navy survey ships. The operations continued until December 1957, with 63,000 square nautical miles (216,000 square kilometers) of hydrography accomplished. Upon their termination, Pioneer steamed to San Francisco, where she arrived in January 1958. After an overhaul and post-overhaul fitting-out, Pioneer resumed survey work for the Navy on 1 May 1958, this time off the southern coast of California. Upon completing this, she deployed to the Western Pacific, where she cooperated with the U.S. Navy oceanographic survey ship USS Rehoboth (AGS-50) – also a former Barnegat-class seaplane tender – and the United States Army cable ship USACS Albert J. Myer in completing 65,196 square nautical miles (223,622 square kilometers) of hydrography around Wake Island and Eniwetok Atoll, guided by LORAN, LORAN-C, and EPI. Completing these operations on 12 November 1958, she steamed to San Francisco for annual repairs and the installation of new equipment.

After conducting sea trials of the new equipment on 11 February 1959, Pioneer departed Alameda, California, on 20 February 1959 bound for Honolulu, Territory of Hawaii. From there she deployed for further hydrographic work in the western Pacific. Pioneer herself and her survey launches completed inshore hydrography of the project area on 28 May 1959, after which Pioneer conducted offshore hydrography controlled by LORAC and LORAN, beginning with an exploratory survey of the entire project area, followed by surveys for the location and routes of submarine cables. She completed the project in June 1959 and returned to Alameda on 23 June 1959.

On 9 September 1959, Pioneer departed California, stopped at Pearl Harbor, Hawaii, and then proceeded to Kwajalein Atoll, where she performed hydrographic survey operations in support of a classified U.S. Navy project. Completing these, she departed Kwajalein on 14 November 1959 and arrived at Alameda on 29 November 1959, where she underwent an overhaul and routine repairs and prepared for the 1960 field season. On 24 March 1960, she departed Alameda bound for Pearl Harbor – running a deep-sea sounding line for the Commander, Pacific Missile Test Range, along the way – and resumed hydrographic operations under SHORAN control. She completed these on 1 July 1960 and during her voyage home ran a bathymetric profile from Roi-Namur at Kwajalein Atoll to Point Buchon, California, which she reached on 25 July 1960. She then underwent maintenance and routine repairs, which were completed on 23 August 1960. She completed the 1960 field season with operations off California, including the establishment of EPI and SHORAN stations on the coast to support offshore oceanographic work and involving use of a bathythermograph to make ocean surface temperature measurements for the United States Fish and Wildlife Service's Bureau of Commercial Fisheries, drift measurements, the use of a towed magnetometer, oceanographic and atmospheric measurements at various locations, and the investigation by her survey launches of possible shoaling in San Francisco Bay.

=== 1961 field season ===
Prior to the 1961 field season, Pioneer underwent major repairs to her hull plating, and the Coast and Geodetic Survey equipped her with a gravity meter and a towed transducer. On 11 April 1961, she began the 1961 field season, departing Alameda for Kodiak, Alaska. Along the way, she developed information on four seamounts, conducted oceanographic measurements, released weather balloons and made frequent meteorological reports, and collected gravity measurements. Her personnel inspected the Seismic Sea Wave Warning System gauge and the standard tide gauge at Womens Bay and the nautical chart agency at Kodiak.

Pioneer then set out from Kodiak to conduct ocean surveys in the North Pacific Ocean between the Aleutian Islands and Hawaiian Islands to the limit of LORAN-C control, during which she again released weather balloons and made frequent meteorological reports, conducted bathymetric measurements, employed her magnetometer and gravity meter, took bottom core samples in Shelikof Strait, discovered a layer of warm water at depths of 320 to 440 feet (98 to 134 meters) between 50 degrees and 53 degrees North latitude, across all sounding lines, and discovered eleven seamounts. After a rendezvous with the Coast and Geodetic Survey ocean survey ships USC&GS Pathfinder (OSS 30) and USC&GS Surveyor (OSS 32) at Naval Station Kodiak in Kodiak, she departed Kodiak on 6 July 1961 to conduct bathymetry and oceanography in the Aleutian Trench. Arriving at Adak on Adak Island in the Aleutians on 11 July 1961, she conducted gravimetric measurements and investigated the westerly set of currents in the area, also launching weather balloons and making meteorological observations.

Pioneer visited Honolulu for the 25–29 August 1961 meeting of the Tenth Pacific Science Congress. Departing Honolulu on 7 September 1961, she resumed the survey of the North Pacific she had begun in 1960, discovering gravimetric anomalies north of the Hawaiian Islands and 22 seamounts rising 3,000 feet (910 meters) or more above the general bottom depth of 17,100 feet (5,200 meters). During the voyage, she also collected specimens using plankton nets and fishing trawls in support of U.S. Fish and Wildlife Service Bureau of Commercial Fisheries studies of salmon, studied marine sedimentary processes, investigated the possible pollution of ocean and rain water by Soviet nuclear tests, and collected numerous manganese nodules in core samples before returning to Honolulu on 12 October 1961. She departed on 18 October 1961 to return to California, where she arrived on 25 October 1961, running a sounding line en route.

=== 1962 field season ===
After an overhaul, Pioneer set out on 25 February 1962 to begin the 1962 field season, running a deep-sea sounding line to Hawaii. Departing Pearl Harbor on 16 March 1962, she resumed her survey of the North Pacific Ocean, running a sounding line to 35 degrees 30 minutes North latitude, and another sounding line to San Francisco, where she arrived on 25 March 1962. After 20 of her personnel attended Radiation and Decontamination School, she departed California on 20 April 1962 and conducted an investigation of the Pacific waters in which the recent underwater nuclear test Dominic Swordfish had taken place, including water temperature measurements, chemical analyses, measurements of radioactivity and of the different elements making up the radioactive water in the area of the underwater nuclear explosion, and study of the effects of radioactivity on plant and animal life in and near the test area. She completed the project on 25 June 1962 and returned to California, arriving at Oakland. She had conducted gravimetric measurements continuously throughout the voyage.

Pioneer underwent an overhaul, then conducted trials of a new deep-sea anchoring winch installed aboard her before departing Oakland on 9 August 1962 and returning to her survey of the North Pacific, running a sounding line along 36 degrees 30 minutes North latitude as well as taking gravimetric, meteorological, and magnetic measurements, and she made oceanographic observations in the Aleutian Trench. After calling at Naval Station Kodiak for supplies, she departed Kodiak on 1 September 1962, ran a magnetic survey and gravimetric transect of about 1,400 nautical miles (2,600 kilometres) for the University of California, and resumed her North Pacific survey, making further gravimetric, magnetic field, bathythermograph, current, and meteorological observations and conducting underwater photography.

Pioneer arrived at Honolulu on 28 September 1962. then made a voyage to Hilo, Hawaii, during which she ran a gravity transect to a point 100 nautical miles (190 kilometres) southwest of the island of Hawaii and then to the island's westernmost point and around the south of the island to Hilo. She also made 20 successful dredge hauls on the ridge atop the east rift of Kilauea Volcano, took deep-sea photographs of the rift, and made six dredge hauls along underwater volcanoes to the south and southwest of the island. She ran gravity transects northeast of Hilo and east of Oahu before departing Hawaii, concluding the 1962 season with deep-sea sounding lines during her return to California, where she arrived at San Francisco on 31 October 1962. She had again made continuous gravimetric measurements since putting to sea in August 1962.

=== 1963 field season ===
Pioneer put to sea again on 6 February 1963 to resume her survey of the North Pacific and run trials for her gravity meter. Between 7 and 14 February she ran a deep-sea sounding line into the survey area in the North Pacific, then continued survey work she had left incomplete in 1961, including weather observations, almost continuous use of her gravity meter and magnetometer, and deep-sea sounding lines from Hawaii to San Francisco and return that each crossed the gravity meter test range. After a port call, she put to sea again on 1 May 1963, making Nansen bottle casts, collecting bottom samples – including a seven-foot (2.1-meter) core sample taken at a depth of 22,170 feet (6,760 meters) in the Aleutian Trench – studying currents with drift bottles and a geomagnetic electrokinematograph, photographing the ocean bottom, and taking bathythermograph measurements. She also assisted the United States Air Force by deploying and recovering a mock-up of the Project Mercury space capsule off of Oahu so that the Air Force could practice parachuting men and equipment into the Pacific to place a flotation collar around it. She called at Kodiak from 27 to 31 May 1963, then returned to the North Pacific to continue her survey project, operating near 161 degrees West longitude between 39 degrees and 54 degrees North latitude. She discovered a 10,080-foot-tall (3,072-meter-tall) seamount in general depths of 18,000 feet (5,500 meters) at 40°47′00″N 160°17′00″W before departing the area on 13 June 1963 to run a deep-sea sounding line to California, calibrating her gravity meter on the San Francisco test range along the way, and she berthed at Oakland on 18 June 1963.

Pioneer made another voyage to the North Pacific survey grounds later in the 1963 field season, calibrating her gravity meter, making gravimetric measurements, and experimenting with the design of Nansen bottles, bathythermograph collection speeds, the use of a thermoprobe at a depth of 9,000 feet (2,700 meters) and the use of a sea sled to capture specimens. She concluded the 1963 season with a deep-sea sounding line run from Honolulu to Oakland.

=== 1964 field season and International Indian Ocean Expedition ===
On 11 February 1964, Pioneer departed California to begin a six-month cruise. After completing the calibration of her gravity meter, she began a deep-sea sounding line to Hawaii on 13 February 1964, making hydrographic, magnetic, gravity, and bathythermograph observations, plankton tows, and biological productivity hauls along the way. Pioneer departed Honolulu on 25 February 1964 on the next leg of her cruise, which took her from Honolulu to Manila in the Philippines, passing near the Mariana Islands. She then proceeded from Manila to Singapore, transiting the southern South China Sea with a stop at Jesselton in Sabah, East Malaysia, on Borneo in Malaysia.

On 23 March 1964, Pioneer began her participation in the International Indian Ocean Expedition (IIOE), a multinational study of the Indian Ocean that lasted from 1 September 1959 to 31 December 1965. Leaving Singapore on 27 March 1964, she proceeded through the Strait of Malacca, stopped at Penang Island in Malaysia, then crossed the Andaman Sea, Bay of Bengal, and Indian Ocean – becoming the first ship in the history of the United States Coast Survey or U.S. Coast and Geodetic Survey to visit the Indian Ocean – to the mouth of India's Hooghly River, where a harbor pilot met her and conned her up the river to a berth in Calcutta. From Calcutta, she moved on to Colombo, Ceylon. On 25 May 1964, she departed Colombo and continued to Penang Island, then on to Phuket, Thailand, and Djakarta, Indonesia, completing her participation in the IIOE on 23 June 1964. She then visited Palau from 9 to 11 July 1964 and Apra Harbor, Guam, from 17 to 19 July 1964, then stopped at Honolulu, where she arrived on 30 July 1964.

Throughout the cruise, as water depths and conditions permitted, Pioneer made the same routine hydrographic, magnetic, gravimetric, and bathythermograph measurements and observations, plankton tows, and biological productivity hauls that she had made between California to Honolulu on the first leg of her cruise in February. In the South China Sea, she dredged the bottom in the vicinity of Seahorse Shoal and her scuba divers examined the peak of the seamount there for 30 minutes and took color photographs of it. Off Jesselton, she observed an oceanographic station and took a bottom core sample and deep-sea photographs. During her voyage from Singapore to Calcutta, she investigated the waters around the Andaman Islands, Nicobar Islands, and Langkawi islands and along the west side of the Malay Peninsula, employing her geological echo profiler (GEP) and gathering data on the sea bottom via core samples and dredging, and she examined the Ganges Canyon, the Trincomalee Canyon, and several undersea channels she crossed while running a track line from Little Andaman Island to the east coast of Ceylon. While proceeding from Colombo to Penang, she investigated the waters north of Sumatra and an undersea canyon south of Sumatra near the Sunda Strait. During the Djakarta-to-Palau leg of her trip, she investigated the waters of Lombok Strait, ran a track line from Lombok Strait across the Java Sea, through Makassar Strait, and across the Celebes Sea, and collected a 16½-foot (5-meter) bottom core sample from the Mindanao Trench. She also made a GEP profile along the northern and eastern sides of and across the Palau Trench, and she collected dredging samples from its western and eastern slopes. While en route Guam from Palau, she collected a 13-foot (4.0-meter) bottom core sample from the Mariana Trench and made a GEP profile and took bottom samples west of Guam. On the final leg of the cruise, she made a track line from Guam to Honolulu, discovering nine seamounts along the way, the largest of which rose to 3,960 feet (1,210 meters) below the surface in waters with a general depth of 18,000 feet (5,500 meters) about 200 nautical miles (370 kilometres) south of Wake Island.

Ashore during the cruise, Pioneer's personnel made courtesy calls on the United States Ambassadors at Manila, Colombo, and Djakarta; the U.S. Consuls General at Singapore and Calcutta; the Philippine Coast and Geodetic Survey; and the Malaysian Geological Survey. Scientists embarked aboard Pioneer gave talks at the Bose Institute, the Zoological Survey of India, the Geological Survey of India, the Birla Industrial and Technical Museum, and the University of Ceylon. Pioneer personnel held press conferences in Penang and Djakarta, and the ship held open houses in Manila, Singapore, Calcutta, Colombo, Penang, and Djakarta.

Pioneer departed Honolulu on 4 August 1964 to return to California, running a deep-sea track line while en route. During the passage, she collected oceanographic data, and made hydrographic, gravity, and magnetic observations continuously and bathythermograph and weather observations every two hours. She also lowered her deep-sea camera equipment to take stereoscopic images of the ocean floor. She ran one line across the gravity meter test range prior to entering San Francisco Bay and surveyed the waters around the piers of the Golden Gate Bridge. She completed her 1964 cruise with her arrival at San Francisco on 11 August 1964, exactly six months after she departed, having covered 31,507 nautical miles (58,351 km; 36,258 mi) since her departure.

=== 1965 field season ===
In early 1965, Pioneer ran deep-sea track lines between California and Hawaii, making oceanographic observations, and investigating a reported seamount that rose to 5,850 feet (1,780 meters) below the surface. She conducted ocean surveys west of Honolulu to 165 degrees West longitude between 20 degrees 30 minutes North and 35 degrees 30 minutes North. She also conducted a calibration loop to determine the accuracy of the Navy Satellite Navigation System (NAVSAT); comparison of the information acquired at Kodiak, Adak, Attu, Midway Atoll, Johnston Atoll, and Honolulu suggested that the NAVSAT system would be useful in ocean surveys.

=== Final disposition ===
Pioneer was sold for scrap on 4 May 1966 to National Metal and Steel Corporation, Terminal Island, California.

=== Commemoration ===
A number of features on the floor of the Pacific Ocean, including the Pioneer fracture zone and Pioneer Ridge, are named for Pioneer.

== Bibliography ==
- This article incorporates text from the public domain Dictionary of American Naval Fighting Ships. The entry can be found here.
- NOAA History, A Science Odyssey: Tools of the Trade: Ships: Coast and Geodetic Survey Ships: Pioneer
- National Geospatial Intelligence Agency: Undersea Features History
- Chesneau, Roger. Conway's All the World's Fighting Ships 1922–1946. New York: Mayflower Books, Inc., 1980. ISBN 0-8317-0303-2.
- United States Department of Commerce Environmental Science Services Administration and Coast and Geodetic Survey, International Indian Ocean Expedition USC&GS Ship Pioneer – 1964, Volume 2, Data Report: Oceanographic Stations, BT Observations, and Bottom Samples 11 February to 11 August 1964. Washington, D.C.: Government Printing Office, 1965.
