= Geology of Himachal Pradesh =

- Useful Links
- Geological time scale
- Related Disciplines
- Structural geology; Tectonics
- Portal
- Earth Sciences Portal

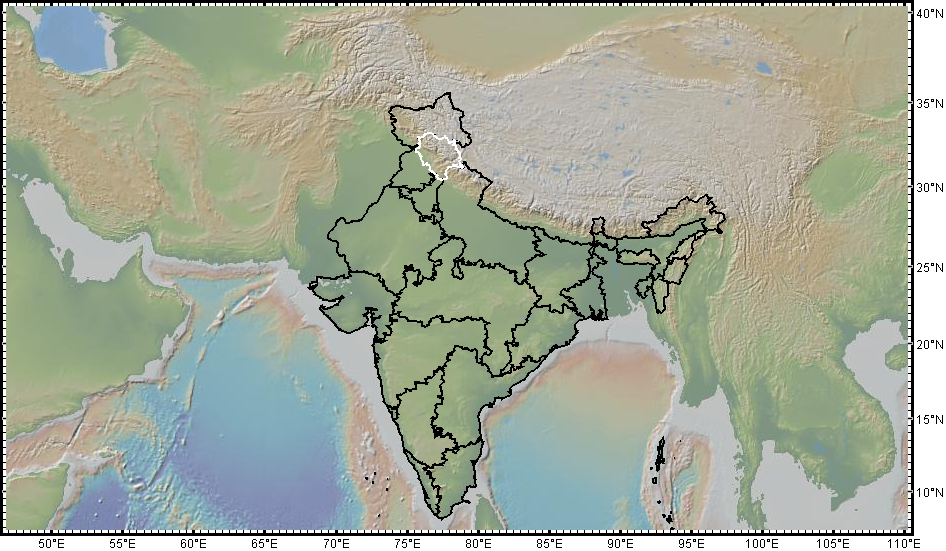
Fig.1 White line indicates the location of Himachal Pradesh. Figure made with GeoMapApp (www.geomapapp.org) / CC BY / CC BY (Ryan et al., 2009).

The geology of Himachal Pradesh is dominated by Precambrian rocks that were assembled and deformed during the India-Asia collision and the subsequent Himalayan orogeny. The Northern Indian State Himachal Pradesh is located in the Western Himalaya (Fig. 1). It has a rugged terrain, with elevation ranging from 320m to 6975m. Rock materials in the region are largely from the Indian craton, and their ages range from the Paleoproterozoic to the present day. It is generally agreed that the Indian craton collided with Asia 50-60 million years ago (Ma). Rock sequences were thrust and folded immensely during the collision. The area has also been shaped by focused orographic precipitation, glaciation and rapid erosion.

== Major tectonic units ==
The elevation of Himachal Pradesh increases from SW to NE, and the orogenic materials making up this area also vary in the same direction. There are 5 major tectonic units in the form of fault-bounded NW-SE trending belts (Fig. 2). From SW to NE they are named the Indo-Gangetic Plain, Sub-Himalayan Sequence, Lesser Himalayan Sequence, Greater Himalayan Crystalline complex and Tethyan Himalayan Sequence (Fig. 2, 3).

The Indo-Gangetic Plain represents a recent, active foreland basin which comprises alluvial sediments derived from the Himalaya. The Sub-Himalayan Sequence mainly represents sediments deposited in the foreland basin during Miocene time. The Lesser Himalayan Sequence is a unit emplaced before the mountain-building processes. The Greater Himalayan Crystalline complex represents a high-grade unit moved towards SW from the hinterland. The Tethyan Himalayan Sequence represents strata deposited in the former passive margin in the Northern edge of Indian plate.

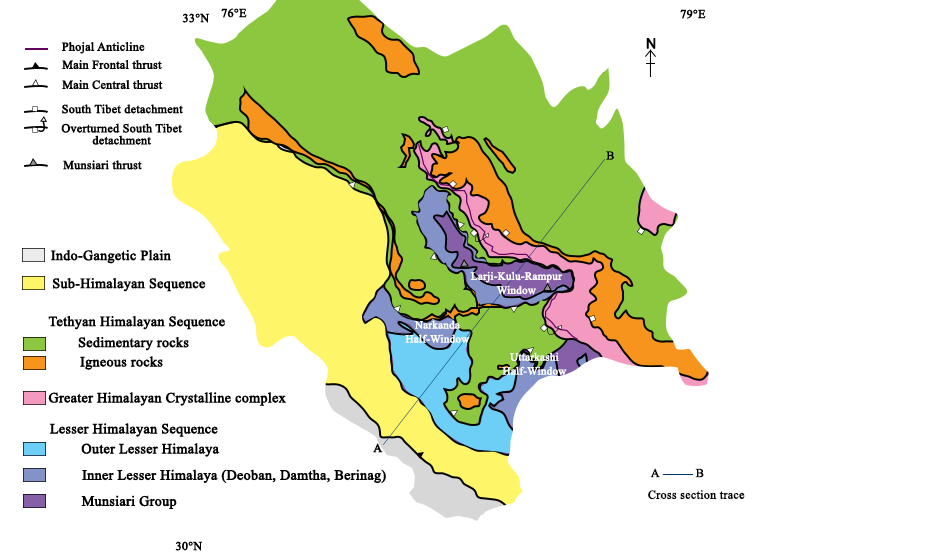
Fig. 2 Simplified geological map of Himachal Pradesh (Modified from Webb, 2013)

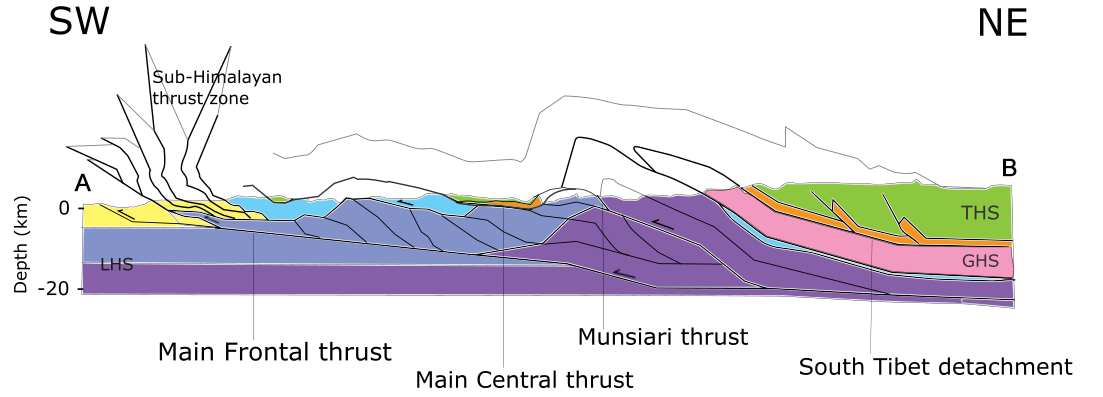
Fig. 3 Cross section of Himachal Pradesh (modified from Webb, 2013) Tectonic units in the region are arranged generally in the NE-SW direction. Large scale folds and faults are present.

=== Indo-Gangetic Plain ===
The Indo-Gangetic Plain (IGP), located at the southwestern fringe of the state, is an alluvial plain composed of sediments eroded from the Himalayan rocks. This area is an active depocenter that receives high sediment flux from the nearby major rivers. For instance, a high average erosion rate of 1.8 mm/yr has been reported in the frontal Sutlej's Himalayan catchment, contributing to large sedimentation load. Below the Indo-Gangetic Plain lies the generally undeformed Indian Craton strata. All of them are bounded by the Main Frontal thrust (MFT) at the northeast side.

=== Sub-Himalayan Sequence ===
The Sub-Himalayan Sequence, also named the Siwalik Group, is dominated by Paleocene to Pliocene sedimentary layers. Sediments have a similar origin as those in the Indo-Gangetic Plain. However, sedimentation events started prior to the India-Asia collision and continued until late Miocene, and the depositional environment changed from shallow marine to continental.

Stratigraphy
Age	Unit	Lithology	Deposition environment
Pleistocene-Miocene (11-7Ma)	Siwalik Formation	Sandstone, conglomerate, siltstone	Continent
Miocene (20-13Ma)	Dharamsala Formation	Gray sandstone, siltstone, shale, caliche	Continent
Latest Paleocene-Middle Eocene	Subathu Formation	limestone, shale, minor fine-grained sandstone	Shallow marine
Late Cretaceous-Paleocene	Singtali Formation	limestone, minor quartz arenite	Shallow marine

Two sub-groups have been identified, including the Paleocene to Eocene shallow-marine deposits and the Miocene to Pliocene continental deposits. The Singtali and Subathu Formation made up the older sub-group while the Dharamsala and Siwalik Formation made up the younger one. Separating the two is an Oligocene unconformity. It has been suggested that there was a period of non-deposition during the Oligocene due to temporary uplifting of the Indian continent. At that time, the area rose above sea level. Detachment of the Indian oceanic slab might have induced mantle upwelling, or a forebulge might have developed due to the downward slab-pull.

The Sub-Himalayan Sequence is thrust southwestward in the rate of 10±6 mm/yr along the Main Frontal thrust during the Quaternary. Within the sequence, rocks have been thrust and accreted vastly, forming the Sub-Himalayan Thrust Zone in the southwest Himachal Pradesh (Fig. 3). The unit is bounded by the Krol thrust and Tons thrust on top.

=== Lesser Himalayan Sequence (LHS) ===
The Lesser Himalayan Sequence dominantly consists of metasedimentary rocks, metavolcanic rocks and augen gneiss. Strata were deposited as detrital sediments during Paleoproterozoic to Cambrian and later metamorphosed into greenschist and amphibolite facies rocks. This sequence is bounded by the Main Central thrust on top and can be sub-divided into 4 units.

Stratigraphy
Age	Unit		Lithology	Note
Neoproterozoic-lower Cambrian	Outer Lesser Himalaya	Tal Formation Krol Group Shimla Group Basantpur Formation (Mandhali)	sandstone, siltstone, dolomite, limestone and shale	exposed at the south, southeast part of the state
Paleoproterozoic-Neoproterozoic	Parautochthon	Deoba Group Damtha Group	siliciclastic and carbonate rocks	exposed at the Uttarkashi and Narkanda Half-Windows; part of the Inner Lesser Himalaya
Paleoproterozoic	Berinag Group		sericitic quartz-arenite with metabasalt intrusion	rocks were metamophosed under a greenschist facies condition; part of the Inner Lesser Himalaya
Paleoproterozoic	Munsiari Group	Wangtu Jeori	granitic augen gneiss paragneiss, mica schist	the Munsiari Group is also named Lesser Himalayan Crystalline Sequence (LHCS); experienced amphibolite facies metamorphism between 11 and 6 Ma (Miocene); exposed in tectonic windows (Uttarkashi and Kullu Window)

=== Greater Himalayan Crystalline Complex (GHC) ===
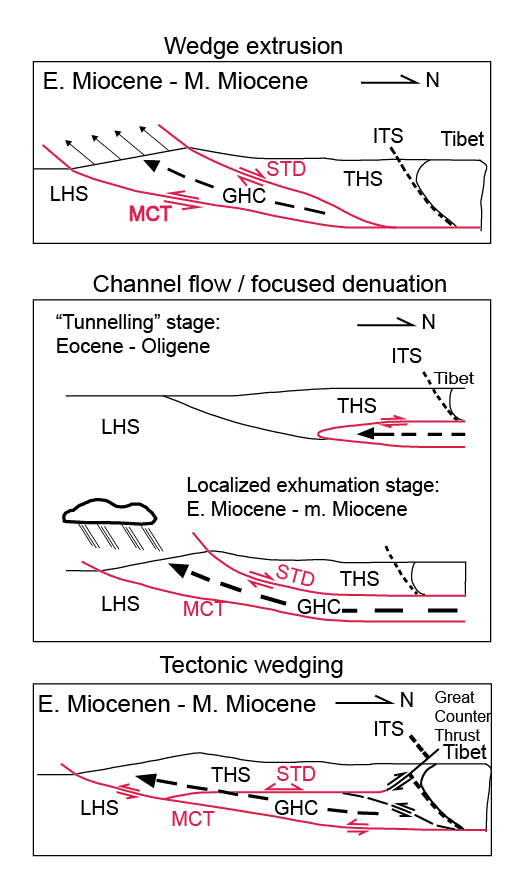
Fig. 6 Three models suggesting how the Greater Himalayan Crystalline complex (GHC) was emplaced. (Figure modified from Webb et al., 2011)

The Greater Himalayan Crystalline complex, also known as the High Himalayan Crystalline Sequence, is composed of high-grade metamorphic rocks aged between Paleoproterozoic and Ordovician. Over the 4.5–8 km thick layer, paragneiss, schist and orthogneiss are observed. Leucogranites are found to be concentrated at the uppermost part of this unit. Metamorphic grade of rocks increases upsection, with staurolite, kyanite, sillimanite and migmatite zones superimposed gradually. The crystalline complex had experienced peak metamorphic condition of 750 °C, 8kbar at around 23Ma.

The crystalline complex is bounded by the Main Central thrust at the base and South Tibet detachment on top. Consensus has not been reached regarding how the Greater Himalayan Crystalline Complex was emplaced to the orogen. Moreover, the anomalous extensional movement along the South Tibet detachment has intrigued many researchers.

==== South Tibet Detachment (STD) ====
The South Tibet detachment lies between the Greater Himalayan Crystalline complex and the Tethyan Himalayan Sequence (Fig. 3). Alternating top-to-southeast and top-to-northwest shear directions have been identified by various ductile shear fabrics along the South Tibet Detachment. It has been suggested that in Himachal Pradesh, the South Tibet detachment is folded and overturned with the Phojal Anticline and joins the Main Central thrust at the southwest side. While some believe the South Tibet Detachment joins the Main Central thrust down-dip, or the two faults being parallel to each other (Fig.6).

=== Tethyan Himalayan Sequence (THS) ===
Stratigraphy
Unit		Note
Sedimentary Rocks	Giumal-Chikkim succession Tandi Group Thaple-Muth-Lipak succession Parahio Formation Haimanta Group	consists of sedimentary and low-grade metasedimantary rocks; deposited at the northern boundary of the Indian continent
Igneous Rocks	Early Paleozoic granitoids Neoproterozoic granite Baragaon granitic gneiss	emplaced in Cambrian-Ordovician, peraluminous with mafic enclaves ca. 830Ma ca. 1850Ma

The Tethyan Himalayan Sequence comprises Neoproterozoic to Cretaceous, fossiliferous sedimentary strata interlayered with Paleoproterozoic to Ordovician igneous rocks. At the base of this unit, Baragaon granitic gneiss having an age of 1840 Ma has been identified. Unlike the Greater Himalayan Crystalline complex in this region, metamorphic grade of rocks decreases upsection across the sequence. It is mostly bounded by the Indus-Tsangpo Suture at the northwest side and the South Tibet Detachment at the base. However, at the western part of Himachal Pradesh (longitude <77°E), the Main Central thrust and Lesser Himalayan Sequence rocks lies right beneath the Tethyan Himalayan Sequence.

The Tethyan Himalayan Sequence covers a large area of the Himachal Pradesh, since it overthrust the Lesser Himalayan Sequence, Greater Himalayan Crystalline Complex and the Sub-Himalayan Sequence successively during the Cenozoic.

== Development of the thrust wedge ==
Crustal materials of Himachal Pradesh were emplaced to the present position in response to the collision between the Indian and Asian continents. As collision proceeds, rocks are shortened and absorbed by subduction, thrusting and erosion. A portion of crust has been recycled to the mantle by subduction and slab break-off. The two colliding blocks have been rubbing against each other. Materials from the Indian Plate were scraped off by the Asian Plate. Both Indian and Asian sourced rocks were accumulated and piled up to form a thrust wedge (Fig. 4).

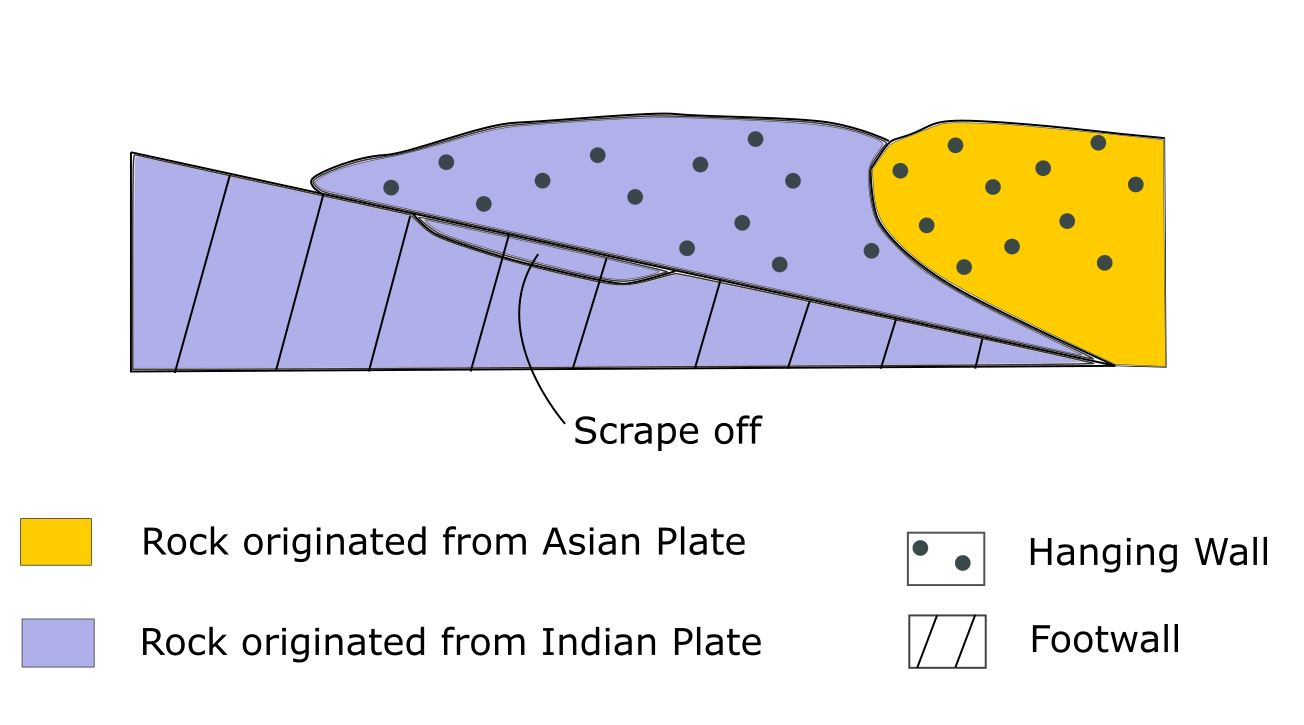
Fig. 4 Schematic diagram showing accretion of rocks by Indian-Asian collision

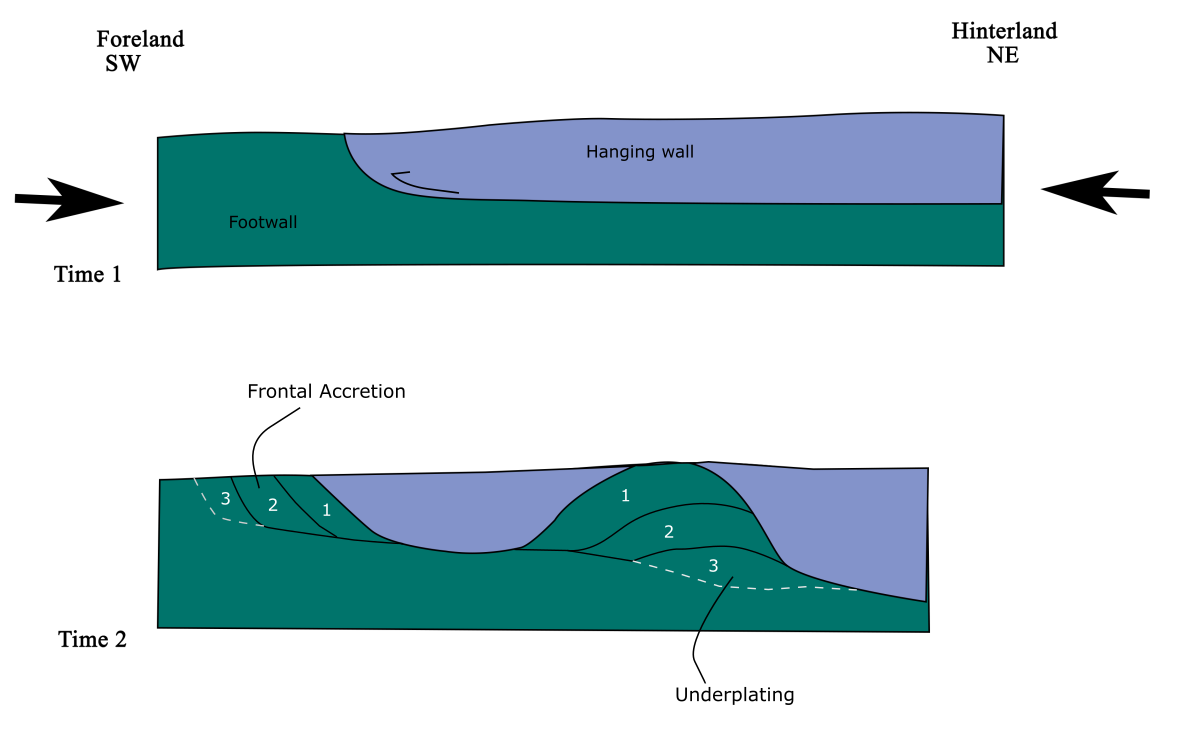
Fig. 5 Development of thrust wedge. Thrusting causes shortening of crust. Materials in the footwall eventually become part of the hanging wall.

Rock units are stacked up and deformed by:

- Frontal accretion — At the frontal part of thrust wedge, new faults propagate forward due to the compressive force. Rocks at the footwall are scraped off and become part of the hanging wall. This process repeats forming slices of rocks in the foreland basin (Fig. 5). Imbricate fans can be found in the Sub-Himalayan Sequence (Fig. 3).
- Underplating — Rock units are thrust and piled up section by section (Fig. 5). At the middle part of the thrust wedge, the Lesser Himalayan Sequence started to develop thrust horses and antiformal stacks at depth since 5.4Ma.
- Out of sequence faulting — The Munsiari thrust as the out-of-sequence thrust was developed recently from the Himalayan sole thrust. It truncated the Main Central thrust in this area.

These processes may have occurred simultaneously at different parts of the thrust wedge due to strong strain partitioning.

=== Assembly of the tectonic units ===
There are mainly three different models explaining how the major tectostratigraphic units in Himachal Pradesh came together in Cenozoic (Fig. 6). The main controversy surrounds how the Greater Himalayan Crystalline complex was emplaced.

==== Wedge extrusion model ====
In this model, the Main Central thrust and the South Tibet detachment join down-dip, enveloping the Greater Himalayan Crystalline complex. During early Miocene (23-17Ma), the Greater Himalayan Crystalline sequence was exhumed and verged southwestward with the activation of the Main Central thrust, leaving the surrounding sequences behind. A normal sense of movement was therefore created at the South Tibet detachment.

At the frontal part of the orogen, sustained crustal thickening might have increased loading locally. Substantially, the vertical stress exceeded the horizontal compressive stress. Maximum stress orientation was rotated and a normal fault was formed. In addition, the elevation of the Indian foreland might have surpassed that of Southern Tibet. Therefore, gravitational collapse and backsliding of crustal materials (Tethyan Himalayan Sequence) occurred.

==== Channel flow model ====
In the channel flow model, the Greater Himalayan Crystalline complex was derived from Tibetan protolith instead of Indian protolith. The Main Central thrust and South Tibet detachment are sub-parallel to each other like channel walls. Initially, hot crustal melt was formed at middle to lower crust beneath the Tibetan Plateau. In the Eocene to Oligocene, the low-viscosity materials migrated southward between the Tethyan Himalayan Sequence and Lesser Himalayan Sequence. Later during early to middle Miocene, the upper crust in front of the channel flow was weakened by focused denudation. The Greater Himalayan Sequence is then exhumed to the modern position.

==== Tectonic wedging model ====
In the tectonic wedging model, the Greater Himalayan Crystalline complex was emplaced to the region at depth, and thrust towards southwest between the THS and LHS rocks during early to middle Miocene. The Main Central thrust and South Tibet detachment merge at the southwest side. It has been suggested that both the Lesser Himalayan Sequence and GHS were moving towards the SW, while their difference in pace had created relative top-to-southwest and top-to-northeast shear along the South Tibet detachment at different times. Besides, the South Tibet detachment is linked to the Great Counter thrust (backthrust) of the thrust wedge.

The Greater Himalayan Crystalline complex was not exposed until 5 Ma.

== Climatic control on topographic growth ==
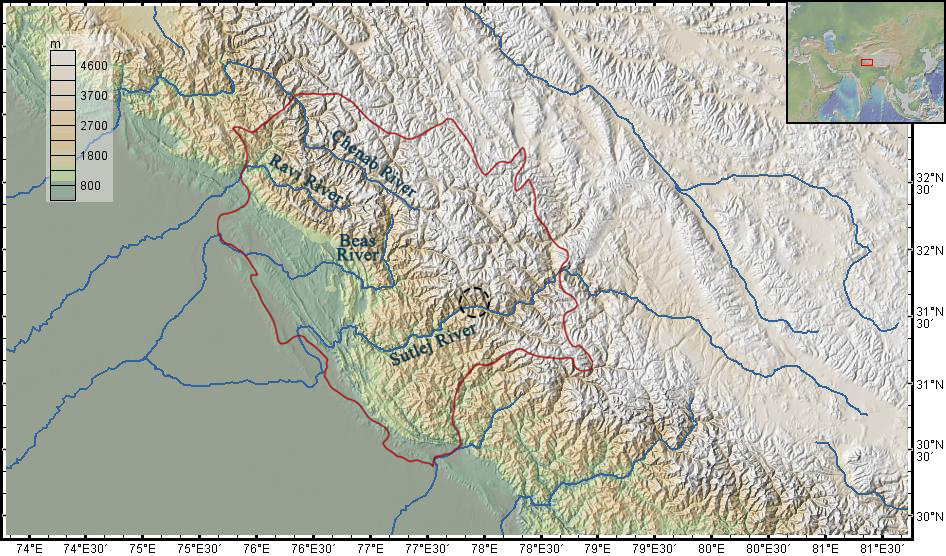
Fig. 6 Major rivers in Himachal Pradesh. The black ellipse indicates the area that receives high rainfall. Figure made with GeoMapApp (www.geomapapp.org) / CC BY / CC BY (Ryan et al., 2009).

Exhumation of crustal materials means the upward movement of rocks relative to the ground surface, which can be caused by surface erosion, tectonic uplift or the coupled effect of the two. In Himachal Pradesh, erosion is generally controlled by precipitation pattern and glaciation.

=== Precipitation ===
Rainfall is distributed unevenly across Himachal Pradesh. Orographic precipitation is concentrated across a 50–70 km wide area at elevation 2000-3500m (Fig. 7). The zone coincides with the Kulu window. It receives high rainfall of >2000mm/yr, which is twice the amount of global average rainfall (1000mm/yr). In areas with elevation lower or higher than the zone, rainfall is either not yet formed from moist air or shadowed by orographic barrier.

Therefore, focused precipitation allows effective removal of rocks by fluvial erosion, especially along major rivers (e.g. Sutlej River) that crosscut the tectonic windows. Major landslides and debris flow have also been recorded. In other words, denudation is especially rapid in that particular area. To accommodate the loss of load, isostatic and tectonic uplift may be enhanced locally. Hotter rocks at depth are brought up and in turn promote heat advection within the crust. Crustal materials are then weakened and can be eroded easily to maintain a steep topography. This positive feedback demonstrates how surface processes have affected tectonic movements in Himachal Pradesh.

As a result, rocks originally situated at depth are exhumed and exposed at the earth's surface.

==== Tectonic windows ====
In Himachal Pradesh, there are 2 major tectonic windows including the Larji-Kulu-Rampur window and the Uttarkashi half-window (Fig.2). The Munsiari Group, originally situated at the base of the Lesser Himalayan Sequence, is exposed at the windows. The crystalline rocks exposed are found to have exceptionally young apatite fission track cooling age of less than 3Ma and rapid cooling rate of 40-50 °C/Ma, comparing to other rocks in the region. This indicates that the Munsiari Group has experienced rapid exhumation in those areas. It is estimated that the rocks near and furthest away from major rivers were exhumed at a rate of 1.4±0.2 mm/yr and 1.1±0.4 mm/yr respectively. With these exhumation rates, 10–15 km of overlying rocks could have been removed since 10Ma (late Miocene).

=== Glaciation ===
Fig. 7 Glacial erosion and deposition

It has been estimated that 9.4% of land in the Himachal Pradesh is covered by glaciers. During the Quaternary, glacier in the region has retreated and advanced in different times (5 glacial episodes recorded), in response to changes in temperature, precipitation and monsoon circulation. Glacial processes erode the mountain range through abrasion, crushing and plucking, and create large overdeepenings. Besides, glacial melt contributes to fluvial discharge, and determines the erosive power of rivers.

== Geohazards ==
Fig.8 Earthquake zone map of India. Himachal Pradesh lies within zone IV and V

Himachal Pradesh is prone to earthquake. The major seismic faults including the Main Frontal thrust, Main Central thrust and the Main Boundary thrust are responsible to the high seismic activities in this state. According to the Bureau of Indian Standards, Himachal Pradesh lies within zone IV (severe intensity zone) and zone V (severe intensity zone). These zones represents earthquake intensity VIII and IX on the Modified Mercalli scale.

== See also ==
- Tibetan Plateau
- Himachal Pradesh
- Paleogeography of the India–Asia collision system
