= Ron G. Mason =

British geologist (1916–2009)

Ronald George Mason (Winsor, Hampshire, England, 24 December 1916 – London, 16 July 2009) was one of the oceanographers whose pioneering Cold War geomagnetic survey work lead to the discovery of magnetic striping on the seafloor. First discovering magnetic stripes on the bottom of the Pacific Ocean off the United States West Coast, he later also identified them around the Mid-Atlantic Ridge.

== Career ==
Mason received his doctorate in geophysics at Imperial College, London, in 1947.

In 1955, while on sabbatical at the California Institute of Technology in Pasadena, California, Mason secured permission to embark and tow the ASQ-3A fluxgate magnetometer, developed by Victor Vacquier of the Scripps Institution of Oceanography, behind the United States Coast and Geodetic Survey's survey ship USC&GS Pioneer (OSS 31) while she participated in a joint survey effort with the U.S. Navy. Scripps was cooperating in order to map any magnetic anomalies the magnetometer detected on the seafloor. During the summer of 1955, Mason arranged to have the ASQ-3A – originally designed for use aboard aircraft – housed in a non-magnetic, fishlike container, making it the first marine magnetometer. In August 1955, Pioneer conducted a survey in the Pacific Ocean along the United States West Coast from Point Conception, California, to Cape Flattery, Washington, with Mason aboard and the ASQ-3A trailing in her wake in its container. Within hours, Mason detected an unmistakable pattern of north-south magnetic "stripes" in the seafloor rocks; as Pioneer's cruise continued, Mason continued to observe this pattern throughout the survey area. Mason's work aboard Pioneer with the fluxgate magnetometer thus revealed "magnetic striping" on the floor of the Pacific, the first time it had been noted anywhere. The magnetic data he collected from the ocean crust later was interpreted as containing field reversals that were used by Canadian geophysicist Lawrence Morley to prove seafloor spreading and plate tectonics.

Mason was appointed to the Chair of Pure Geophysics at Imperial College in 1967 and became head of the college's Geophysics Department in 1977. During the 1980s, he pioneered extremely accurate techniques for measuring the Earth's crust which further confirmed plate tectonic movements.

== See also ==
USC&GS Pioneer (OSS 31)
