= Slab suction =

Force in plate tectonics

Slab suction is one of the four main forces that drive plate tectonics. It creates a force that pulls down plates as they are subducting and speeds up their movement, creating larger amounts of displacement.

It is because of these forces, slab pull, ridge push, mantle convection, and slab suction that the Earth's crust is able to move and orient itself in various arrangements. This is how throughout the Earth's history there has been the ability to create super continents where all of the land mass has converged into one (for example, Pangaea).

Slab suction occurs when a subducting slab drives flow in the lower mantle by exerting additional force down in the direction of the mantle's convection currents. This flow then exerts shear tractions on the base of nearby plates. This driving force is important when the slabs (or portions thereof) are not strongly attached to the rest of their respective tectonic plate. They cause both the subducting and overriding plate to move in the direction of the subduction zone.

This force occurs between two colliding plates where one is subducting beneath the other. As one plate subducts, it sets up convection currents in the upper mantle that exert a net trenchward pull, and acts to suck both the plates together.

Slab suction is weaker than slab pull, which is the strongest of the driving forces. When measuring the forces of these two mechanisms, slab pull in subducting plate boundaries for upper mantle slabs is 1.9 × 10^21 N. In comparison slab suction in the upper and lower mantle totaled 1.6 × 10^21 N.

Slab suction in coordination with slab pull are used to analyze the speeds of plates work. When you combine the slab pull of the upper mantle slabs with the slab suction of lower mantle slabs you get a model showing that subducting plates move four times faster than non subducting plates. Computing the slab suction force can give us predictions of the plate velocities by using viscous flow driven by the slabs and adding it to the shear tractions the flow exerts of the base of the plates. Due to the flow in the lower mantle causing slab suction, changes in viscosity will have a much different effect than how it would apply to the upper mantle. In the lower mantle if you have a decrease in viscosity the flow will become much more rapid and increase the effect of slab suction and if viscosity in the lower mantle increases the effects of slab suction will decrease.

Associated with the slab suction force is the idea of trench roll-back. As a slab of oceanic crust subducts into the mantle, the hinge of the plate (the point where the plate begins to subduct) tends to regress away from the trench. This occurs because there is effectively no force to hold the hinge in one location.
