= International Indian Ocean Expedition =

Multinational hydrographic survey

The International Indian Ocean Expedition (IIOE) was a large-scale multinational hydrographic survey of the Indian Ocean which took place from September 1, 1959, to December 31, 1965, Jawaharlal Nehru then PM of India inaugurated International Indian Ocean Expedition (IIOE) in 1959 with collaboration with foreign universities. It worked to describe and understand the basic features of the Indian Ocean.

It is renamed as The National Institute of Oceanography (NIO) on 1st January 1966 as one of 38 constituent laboratories of the CSIR.

N.K. Panikkar, Padma Shri, was appointed as director of this institute, a position he held until his retirement in May 1973. It involved over 45 research vessels from 14 countries. It was sponsored by the Scientific Committee on Oceanographic Research, and later by the Intergovernmental Oceanographic Commission.

Vast amounts of data on oceanic organisms were collected. For example, specimens of Polychaetes (marine worms) were collected from the coasts of the Indian Ocean.

== See also ==
- National Institute of Oceanography, India
- USS Mobjack (AGP-7)
