= Slab (geology) =

Portion of a tectonic plate that is being subducted

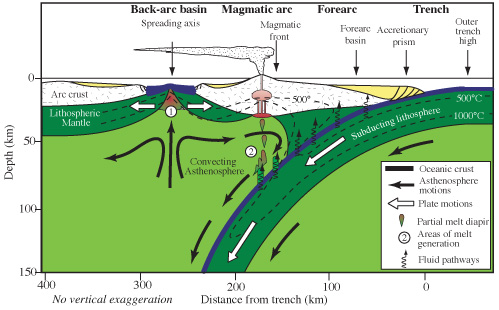
The figure is a schematic diagram depicting a subduction zone. The subduction slab on the right enters the mantle with a varying temperature gradient while importing water in a downward motion.

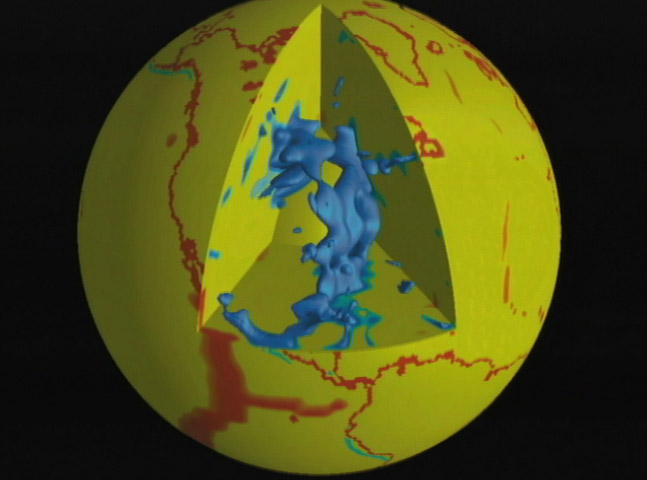
A model of the subducting Farallon slab under North America

In geology, the slab (variously called subducting, downgoing or oceanic lithosphere slab) is a significant constituent of subduction zones. It is the part of the subducting plate which bends downward and descends into the mantle in a convergent tectonic plate boundary.

Although during subduction it is the oceanic lithosphere that subducts, creating an oceanic lithosphere slab, towards the end of this process and just before continental collision, continental lithosphere attached to the subducting oceanic crust slab can also subduct. Consequently, there can also be continental lithosphere slabs.

Subduction slabs drive plate tectonics by pulling along the lithosphere to which they attach in a process known as slab pull and by inducing currents in the mantle via slab suction. The slab affects the convection and evolution of the Earth's mantle due to the insertion of the hydrous oceanic lithosphere. Dense oceanic lithosphere retreats into the Earth's mantle, while lightweight continental lithospheric material produces active continental margins and volcanic arcs, generating volcanism. Recycling the subducted slab presents volcanism by flux melting from the mantle wedge. The slab motion can cause dynamic uplift and subsidence of the Earth's surface, forming shallow seaways and potentially rearranging drainage patterns.

Geologic features of the subsurface can infer subducted slabs by seismic imaging. Subduction slabs are dynamic; slab characteristics such as slab temperature evolution, flat-slab, deep-slab, and slab detachment can be expressed globally near subduction zones. Temperature gradients of subducted slabs depend on the oceanic plate's time and thermal structures. Slabs experiencing low angle (less than 30 degrees) subduction is considered flat-slab, primarily in southern China and the western United States. Marianas Trench is an example of a deep slab, thereby creating the deepest trench in the world established by a steep slab angle. Slab breakoff occurs during a collision between oceanic and continental lithosphere, allowing for a slab tear; an example of slab breakoff occurs within the Himalayan subduction zone.

== See also ==
- Slab window – Type of gap in a subducted oceanic plate
- Slab graveyard — Place where subducted plates stagnate
