= Slab detachment =

Process occurring in plate tectonics

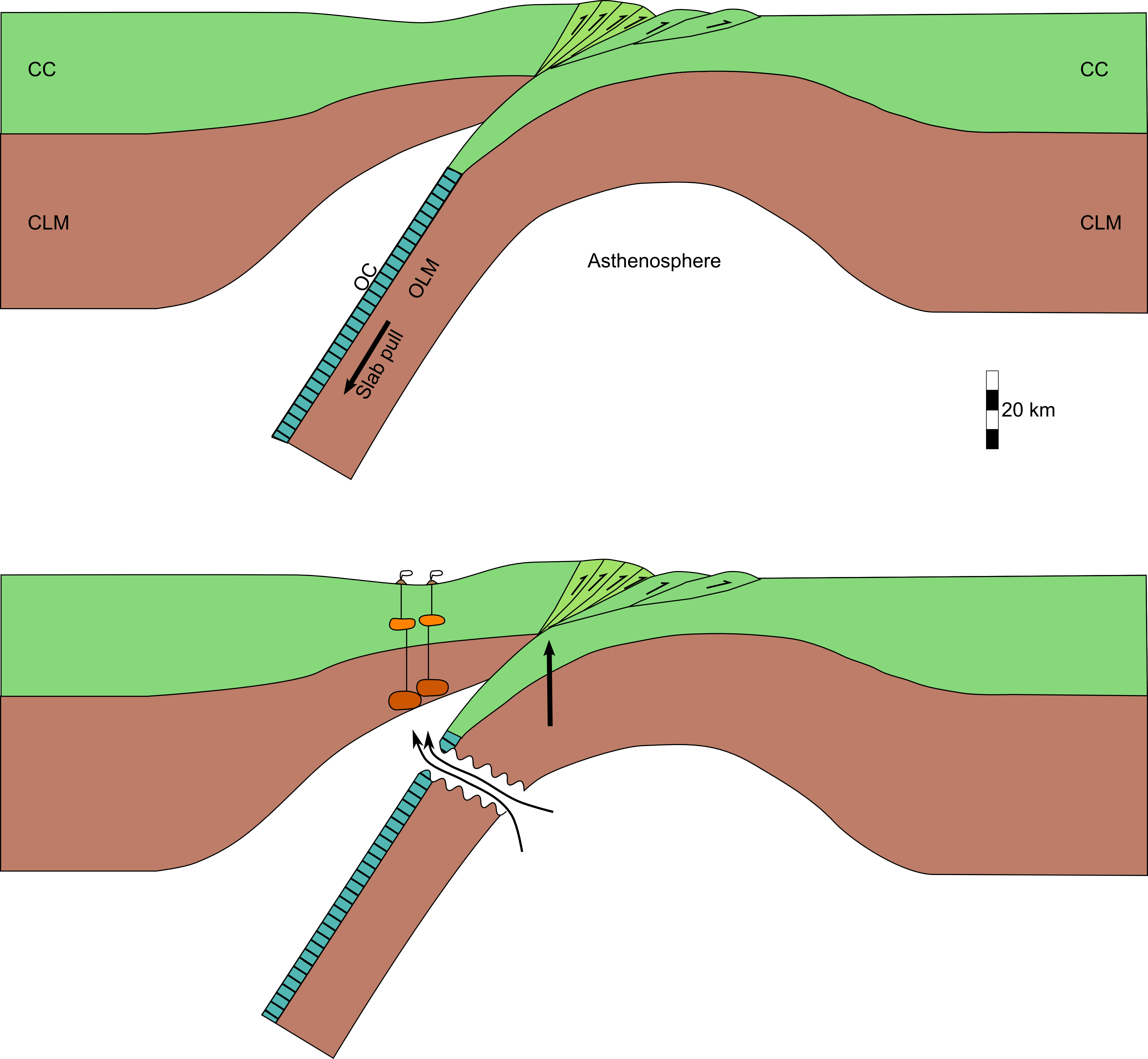
Schematic depiction of the process of slab detachment. OC=oceanic crust, OLM=oceanic lithospheric mantle, CC=continental crust, CLM=continental lithospheric mantle

In plate tectonics, slab detachment or slab break-off may occur during continent-continent or arc-continent collisions. When the continental margin of the subducting plate reaches the oceanic trench of the subduction zone, the more buoyant continental crust will in normal circumstances experience only a limited amount of subduction into the asthenosphere. The slab pull forces will, however, still be present and this normally leads to the breaking off or detachment of the descending slab from the rest of the plate. The isostatic response to the detachment of the downgoing slab is rapid uplift. Slab detachment is also followed by the upwelling of relatively hot asthenosphere to fill the gap created, leading in many cases to magmatism.

The uncritical use of the slab-detachment model to explain disparate observations of magmatism, uplift and exhumation in continental collision zones has been criticised.

== Slab tears ==
Detachment initiates at a particular point on the slab and will then propagate laterally along the descending slab, forming a slab tear. The propagation of the detachment will be accompanied by lateral migration of both the associated uplift and the magmatism. Such laterally propagating tears have been recognised from several collision zones, such as the Hindu Kush part of the Himalayan Belt. The Tertiary magmatism in the Alps observed along the Insubric Line has been argued to result from a rapidly propagating slab tear following continental collision and the initiation of slab breakoff.
