= Ridge push =

Proposed driving force for tectonic plate motion

Ridge push (also known as gravitational slides or sliding plate force) is a proposed driving force for plate motion in plate tectonics that occurs at mid-ocean ridges as the result of the rigid lithosphere sliding down the hot, raised asthenosphere below mid-ocean ridges. Although it is called ridge push, the term is somewhat misleading; it is actually a body force that acts throughout an ocean plate, not just at the ridge, as a result of gravitational pull. The name comes from earlier models of plate tectonics in which ridge push was primarily ascribed to upwelling magma at mid-ocean ridges pushing or wedging the plates apart.

== Mechanics ==
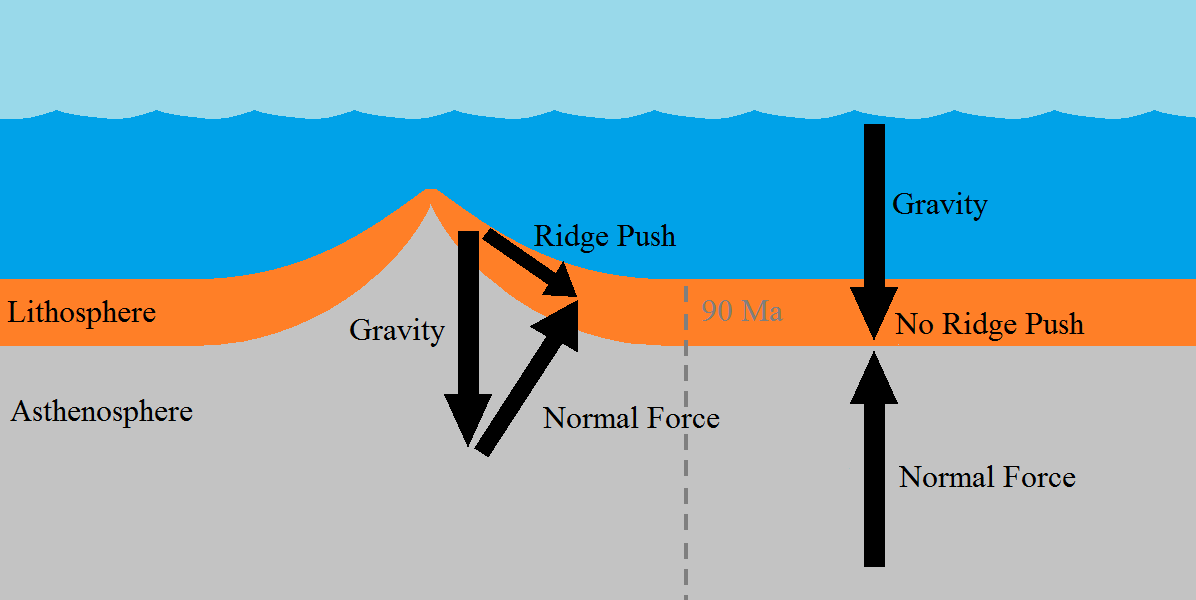
Diagram of a mid-ocean ridge showing ridge push near the mid-ocean ridge and the lack of ridge push after 90 Ma

Ridge push is the result of gravitational forces acting on the young, raised oceanic lithosphere around mid-ocean ridges, causing it to slide down the similarly raised but weaker asthenosphere and push on lithospheric material farther from the ridges.

Mid-ocean ridges are long underwater mountain chains that occur at divergent plate boundaries in the ocean, where new oceanic crust is formed by upwelling mantle material as a result of tectonic plate spreading and relatively shallow (above ~60 km) decompression melting. The upwelling mantle and fresh crust are hotter and less dense than the surrounding crust and mantle, but cool and contract with age until reaching equilibrium with older crust at around 90 Ma. This produces an isostatic response that causes the young regions nearest the plate boundary to rise above older regions and gradually sink with age, producing the mid-ocean ridge morphology. The greater heat at the ridge also weakens rock closer to the surface, raising the boundary between the brittle lithosphere and the weaker, ductile asthenosphere to create a similar elevated and sloped feature underneath the ridge.

These raised features produce ridge push; gravity pulling down on the lithosphere at the mid-ocean ridge is mostly opposed by the normal force from the underlying rock, but the remainder acts to push the lithosphere down the sloping asthenosphere and away from the ridge. Because the asthenosphere is weak, ridge push and other driving forces are enough to deform it and allow the lithosphere to slide over it, opposed by drag at the lithosphere-asthenosphere boundary and resistance to subduction at convergent plate boundaries. Ridge push is mostly active in lithosphere younger than 90 Ma, after which it has cooled enough to reach thermal equilibrium with older material and the slope of the lithosphere-asthenosphere boundary becomes effectively zero.

== History ==
=== Early ideas (1912–1962) ===
Despite its current status as one of the driving forces of plate tectonics, ridge push was not included in any of Alfred Wegener's 1912-1930 proposals of continental drift, which were produced before the discovery of mid-ocean ridges and lacked any concrete mechanisms by which the process might have occurred. Even after the development of acoustic depth sounding and the discovery of global mid-ocean ridges in the 1930s, the idea of a spreading force acting at the ridges was not mentioned in scientific literature until Harry Hess's proposal of seafloor spreading in 1960, which included a pushing force at mid-ocean ridges as a result of upwelling magma wedging the lithosphere apart.

=== Gravitational models ===
In 1964 and 1965, Egon Orowan proposed the first gravitational mechanism for spreading at mid-ocean ridges, postulating that spreading can be derived from the principles of isostasy. In Orowan's proposal, pressure within and immediately under the elevated ridge is greater than the pressure in the oceanic crust to either side due to the greater weight of overlying rock, forcing material away from the ridge, while the lower density of the ridge material relative to the surrounding crust would gradually compensate for the greater volume of rock down to the depth of isostatic compensation. Similar models were proposed by Lliboutry in 1969, Parsons and Richer in 1980, and others. In 1969, Hales proposed a model in which the raised lithosphere of the mid-ocean ridges slid down the elevated ridge, and in 1970 Jacoby proposed that the less dense material and isostasy of Orowan and others' proposals produced uplift which resulted in sliding similar to Hales' proposal. The term "ridge push force" was coined by Forsyth and Uyeda in 1975.

== Significance ==
Early models of plate tectonics, such as Harry Hess's seafloor spreading model, assumed that the motions of plates and the activity of mid-ocean ridges and subduction zones were primarily the result of convection currents in the mantle dragging on the crust and supplying fresh, hot magma at mid-ocean ridges. Further developments of the theory suggested that some form of ridge push helped supplement convection in order to keep the plates moving, but in the 1990s, calculations indicated that slab pull, the force that a subducted section of plate exerts on the attached crust on the surface, was an order of magnitude stronger than ridge push. As of 1996, slab pull was generally considered the dominant mechanism driving plate tectonics. Modern research, however, indicates that the effects of slab pull are mostly negated by resisting forces in the mantle, limiting it to only 2-3 times the effective strength of ridge push forces in most plates, and that mantle convection is probably much too slow for drag between the lithosphere and the asthenosphere to account for the observed motion of the plates. This restores ridge push as one of the dominant factors in plate motion.

=== Opposing forces ===
Ridge push is primarily opposed by plate drag, which is the drag force of the rigid lithosphere moving over the weaker, ductile asthenosphere. Models estimate that ridge push is probably just sufficient to overcome plate drag and maintain the motion of the plate in most areas. Slab pull is similarly opposed by resistance to the subduction of the lithosphere into the mantle at convergent plate boundaries.

=== Notable qualifications ===
Research by Rezene Mahatsente indicates that the driving stresses caused by ridge push would be dissipated by faulting and earthquakes in plate material containing large quantities of unbound water, but they conclude that ridge push is still a significant driving force in existing plates because of the rarity of intraplate earthquakes in the ocean.

In plates with particularly small or young subducting slabs, ridge push may be the predominant driving force in the plate's motion. According to Stefanick and Jurdy, the ridge push force acting on the South American plate is approximately 5 times the slab pull forces acting at its subducting margins because of the small size of the subducting slabs at the Scotia and Caribbean margins. The Nazca plate also experiences relatively small slab pull, approximately equal to its ridge push, because the plate material is young (no more than 50 million years old) and therefore less dense, with less tendency to sink into the mantle. This also causes the subducting Nazca slab to experience flat slab subduction, one of the few places in the world where this currently occurs.
