= Victor Vacquier =

American geophysicist (1907–2009)

Victor Vacquier Sr. (October 13, 1907 – January 11, 2009) was a professor of geophysics at the Scripps Institution of Oceanography at the University of California, San Diego.

Vacquier was born in St. Petersburg, Russia. In 1920, Vacquier escaped the Russian Civil War with his family, taking a horse-drawn sleigh across the ice of the Gulf of Finland to Helsinki, then moving to France and (in 1923) to the United States. He received a B.S. in electrical engineering in 1927 from the University of Wisconsin, and a master's degree in physics in 1929, but never earned a Ph.D. He worked for Gulf Research Laboratories, the research arm of Gulf Oil, in Pittsburgh, Pennsylvania, and then during World War II he moved to the Airborne Instruments Laboratory at Columbia University, where he applied the fluxgate magnetometer, an instrument he had invented at Gulf, to submarine detection. Following the war, he worked at Sperry Gyroscope Inc. developing gyrocompasses; then in 1953 he moved to the New Mexico Institute of Mining and Technology, where he worked on groundwater detection. At Scripps, where he moved in 1957, he directed a program that used his war-surplus flux magnetometers to measure the patterns formed by the Earth's magnetic field on the sea floor; his discovery of large shifts in the patterns in the Mendocino fracture zone was a major impetus behind the theory of plate tectonics, which his later measurements of heat flow on the sea floor also strongly supported.

For his researches, Vacquier was awarded the John Price Wetherill Medal of the Franklin Institute in 1960, the Albatross Award of the American Miscellaneous Society in 1963, the John Adam Fleming Medal of the American Geophysical Union in 1973, the Reginald Fessenden Award of the Society of Exploration Geophysicists in 1976, and the Alexander Agassiz Medal of the United States National Academy of Sciences in 1995 "for his discovery of the flux-gate magnetometer, and for the marine magnetic anomaly surveys that led to the acceptance of the theory of sea-floor spreading.” He died in La Jolla, California on January 11, 2009.

Vacquier's son, Victor D. Vacquier, is also a professor at Scripps, where he studies marine reproductive biology.
