= Slab pull =

Part of the motion of a tectonic plate caused by its subduction

The slab pull happens when the slab of the oceanic crust sinks at the subduction zone and pulls the rest of the plate along. It is often hypothesized to be the gravitationally stronger force compared to the ridge push happening at the mid-ocean ridges.

Slab pull is a geophysical mechanism whereby the cooling and subsequent densifying of a subducting tectonic plate produces a downward force along the rest of the plate. In 1975 Forsyth and Uyeda used the inverse theory method to show that, of the many forces likely to be driving plate motion, slab pull was the strongest. Plate motion is partly driven by the weight of cold, dense plates sinking into the mantle at oceanic trenches. This force and slab suction account for almost all of the force driving plate tectonics. The ridge push at rifts contributes only 5 to 10%.

Carlson et al. (1983) in Lallemand et al. (2005) defined the slab pull force as:

$$F_{sp} = K \times \Delta\rho \times L \times \sqrt{A}$$

Where:

K is 4.2g (gravitational acceleration = 9.81 m/s^{2}) according to McNutt (1984);
Δρ = 80 kg/m^{3} is the mean density difference between the slab and the surrounding asthenosphere;
L is the slab length calculated only for the part above 670 km (the upper/lower mantle boundary);
A is the slab age in Ma at the trench.

The slab pull force manifests itself between two extreme forms:

- The aseismic back-arc extension as in the Izu–Bonin–Mariana Arc.
- The Aleutian and Chile tectonics with strong earthquakes and back-arc thrusting.

Between these two examples there is the evolution of the Farallon Plate: from the huge slab width with the Nevada, the Sevier and Laramide orogenies; the Mid-Tertiary ignimbrite flare-up and later left as Juan de Fuca and Cocos plates, the Basin and Range Province under extension, with slab break off, smaller slab width, more edges and mantle return flow.

Some early models of plate tectonics envisioned the plates riding on top of convection cells like conveyor belts, exactly like just above the yellow arrows in the image above. However, most scientists working today believe that the asthenosphere does not directly cause motion by the friction of such basal forces. The North American Plate is nowhere being subducted, yet it is in motion, and likewise for the African, Eurasian and Antarctic Plates. Ridge push is thought responsible for the motion of these plates.

The subducting slabs around the Pacific Ring of Fire cool down the Earth and its core-mantle boundary. Around the African Plate upwelling mantle plumes from the core-mantle boundary produce rifting including the African and Ethiopian rift valleys.

== See also ==
- Mid-ocean ridge
- Seafloor spreading
- Ridge push
