= Plate tectonics =

Movement of Earth's lithosphere

Map of Earth's 16 principal tectonic plates Convergent: Collision zone Subduction zone Divergent: Extension zone Spreading centre Transform: Dextral transform Sinistral transform

Plate tectonics (from Latin tectonicus, from Ancient Greek τεκτονικός (tektonikós) 'pertaining to building') is the scientific theory that Earth's lithosphere comprises a number of large tectonic plates, which have been slowly moving since 3–4 billion years ago. The model builds on the concept of continental drift, an idea developed during the first decades of the 20th century. Plate tectonics came to be accepted by geoscientists after seafloor spreading was validated in the mid- to late 1960s. The processes that result in plates and shape Earth's crust are called tectonics.

Earth's lithosphere, the rigid outer shell of the planet including the crust and upper mantle, is fractured into seven or eight major plates (depending on how they are defined) and many minor plates or "platelets". Where the plates meet, their relative motion determines the type of plate boundary (or fault): convergent, divergent, or transform. The relative movement of the plates typically ranges from zero to 10 cm annually. Faults tend to be geologically active, with earthquakes, volcanic activity, mountain-building, and oceanic trench formation.

Tectonic plates are composed of the oceanic lithosphere and the thicker continental lithosphere, each topped by its own kind of crust. Along convergent plate boundaries, the process of subduction carries the edge of one plate down under the other plate and into the mantle. This process reduces the total surface area (crust) of Earth. The lost surface is balanced by the formation of new oceanic crust along divergent margins by seafloor spreading, keeping the total surface area constant in a tectonic "conveyor belt".

While Earth is the only planet known to currently have active plate tectonics, evidence suggests that other planets and moons have experienced or exhibit forms of tectonic activity. Jupiter's moon Europa shows signs of ice crustal plates moving and interacting, similar to Earth's plate tectonics. Mars and Venus are thought to have had tectonic activity in the past, though not of the same form as Earth.

Tectonic plates are relatively rigid and float across the ductile asthenosphere beneath. Lateral density variations in the mantle result in convection currents, the slow creeping motion of Earth's solid mantle. At a seafloor spreading ridge, plates move away from the ridge, which is a topographic high, and the newly formed crust cools as it moves away, increasing its density and contributing to the motion. At a subduction zone, the relatively cold, dense oceanic crust sinks down into the mantle, forming the downward convecting limb of a mantle cell, which is the strongest driver of plate motion. The relative importance and interaction of other proposed factors such as active convection, upwelling inside the mantle, and tidal drag of the Moon are subjects of debate.

== Key principles ==
The outer layers of Earth are divided into the lithosphere and asthenosphere. The division is based on differences in mechanical properties and in the method for the transfer of heat. The lithosphere is cooler and more rigid, while the asthenosphere is hotter and flows more easily. In terms of heat transfer, the lithosphere loses heat by conduction, whereas the asthenosphere also transfers heat by convection and has a nearly adiabatic temperature gradient. This division should not be confused with the chemical subdivision of these same layers into the mantle (comprising both the asthenosphere and the mantle portion of the lithosphere) and the crust: a given piece of mantle may be part of the lithosphere or the asthenosphere at different times depending on its temperature and pressure.

The key principle of plate tectonics is that the lithosphere exists as separate and distinct tectonic plates, which ride on the viscoelastic asthenosphere. Plate motions range from 10 to 40 millimetres per year (0.4 to 1.6 in/year) at the Mid-Atlantic Ridge (about as fast as fingernails grow), to about 160 millimetres per year (6.3 in/year) for the Nazca plate (about as fast as hair grows).

Tectonic lithospheric plates consist of lithospheric mantle overlain by one or two types of crustal material: oceanic crust (in older texts called sima from silicon and magnesium) and continental crust (sial from silicon and aluminium). The distinction between oceanic crust and continental crust is based on their modes of formation. Oceanic crust is formed at sea-floor spreading centers. Continental crust is formed through arc volcanism and accretion of terranes through plate tectonic processes. Oceanic crust is denser than continental crust because it has less silicon and more of the heavier elements than continental crust. As a result of this density difference, oceanic crust generally lies below sea level, while continental crust buoyantly projects above sea level.

Average oceanic lithosphere is typically 100 km (62 mi) thick. Its thickness is a function of its age. As time passes, it cools by conducting heat from below, and releasing it radiatively into space. The adjacent mantle below is cooled by this process and added to its base. Because it is formed at mid-ocean ridges and spreads outwards, its thickness is therefore a function of its distance from the mid-ocean ridge where it was formed. For a typical distance that oceanic lithosphere must travel before being subducted, the thickness varies from about 6 km (4 mi) thick at mid-ocean ridges to greater than 100 km (62 mi) at subduction zones. For shorter or longer distances, the subduction zone, and therefore also the mean, thickness becomes smaller or larger, respectively. Continental lithosphere is typically about 200 km (120 mi) thick, though this varies considerably between basins, mountain ranges, and stable cratonic interiors of continents.

The location where two plates meet is called a plate boundary. Plate boundaries are where geological events occur, such as earthquakes and the creation of topographic features such as mountains, volcanoes, mid-ocean ridges, and oceanic trenches. The vast majority of the world's active volcanoes occur along plate boundaries, with the Pacific plate's Ring of Fire being the most active and widely known. Some volcanoes occur in the interiors of plates, and these have been variously attributed to internal plate deformation and to mantle plumes.

Tectonic plates may include continental crust or oceanic crust, or both. For example, the African plate includes the continent and parts of the floor of the Atlantic and Indian Oceans.

Some pieces of oceanic crust, known as ophiolites, failed to be subducted under continental crust at destructive plate boundaries; instead, these oceanic crustal fragments were pushed upward and were preserved within continental crust.

== Types of plate boundaries ==
Three types of plate boundaries exist, characterized by the way the plates move relative to each other. They are associated with different types of surface phenomena. The different types of plate boundaries are:

Divergent boundary

- Divergent boundaries (constructive boundaries or extensional boundaries). These are where two plates slide apart from each other. At zones of ocean-to-ocean rifting, divergent boundaries form by seafloor spreading, allowing for the formation of new ocean basin, e.g. the Mid-Atlantic Ridge and East Pacific Rise. As the ocean plate splits, the ridge forms at the spreading center, the ocean basin expands, and finally, the plate area increases causing many small volcanoes and/or shallow earthquakes. At zones of continent-to-continent rifting, divergent boundaries may cause new ocean basin to form as the continent splits, spreads, the central rift collapses, and ocean fills the basin, e.g., the East African Rift, the Baikal Rift, the West Antarctic Rift, the Rio Grande Rift.

Convergent boundary

- Convergent boundaries (destructive boundaries or active margins) occur where two plates slide toward each other to form either a subduction zone (one plate moving underneath the other) or a continental collision.

Subduction zones are of two types: ocean-to-continent subduction, where the dense oceanic lithosphere plunges beneath the less dense continent, or ocean-to-ocean subduction where older, cooler, denser oceanic crust slips beneath less dense oceanic crust. Deep marine trenches are typically associated with subduction zones, and the basins that develop along the active boundary are often called "foreland basins".
Earthquakes trace the path of the downward-moving plate as it descends into the asthenosphere. A trench forms and, as the subducted plate is heated, it releases volatiles, mostly water from hydrous minerals, into the surrounding mantle. The addition of water lowers the melting point of the mantle material above the subducting slab, causing it to melt. The magma that results typically leads to volcanism.
At zones of ocean-to-ocean subduction, a deep trench forms in an arc shape. The upper mantle of the subducted plate then heats and magma rises to form curving chains of volcanic islands e.g. the Aleutian Islands, the Mariana Islands, the Japanese island arc.
At zones of ocean-to-continent subduction, mountain ranges form, e.g. the Andes, the Cascade Range.
At continental collision zones, there are two masses of continental lithosphere converging. Since they are of similar density, neither is subducted. The plate edges are compressed, folded, and uplifted forming mountain ranges, e.g. Himalayas and Alps. The closure of ocean basins can occur at continent-to-continent boundaries.

Transform boundary

- Transform boundaries (conservative boundaries or strike-slip boundaries) occur where plates are neither created nor destroyed. Instead, two plates slide, or perhaps more accurately grind past each other, along transform faults. The relative motion of the two plates is either sinistral (left side toward the observer) or dextral (right side toward the observer). Transform faults occur across a spreading center. Strong earthquakes can occur along a fault. The San Andreas Fault in California is an example of a transform boundary exhibiting dextral motion.
- Other plate boundary zones occur where the effects of the interactions are unclear, and the boundaries, usually occurring along a broad belt, are not well defined and may show various types of movements in different episodes.

== Driving forces of plate motion ==
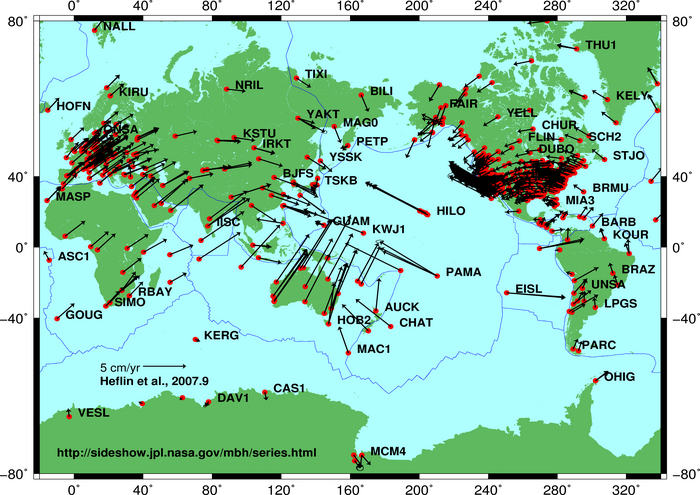
Plate motion based on Global Positioning System (GPS) satellite data from NASA JPL. Each red dot is a measuring point and vectors show direction and magnitude of motion.

Tectonic plates are able to move because of the relative density of oceanic lithosphere and the relative weakness of the asthenosphere. Dissipation of heat from the mantle is the original source of the energy required to drive plate tectonics through convection or large scale upwelling and doming. As a consequence, a powerful source generating plate motion is the excess density of the oceanic lithosphere sinking in subduction zones. When the new crust forms at mid-ocean ridges, this oceanic lithosphere is initially less dense than the underlying asthenosphere, but it becomes denser with age as it conductively cools and thickens. The greater density of old lithosphere relative to the underlying asthenosphere allows it to sink into the deep mantle at subduction zones, providing most of the driving force for plate movement. The weakness of the asthenosphere allows the tectonic plates to move easily towards a subduction zone.

=== Driving forces related to mantle dynamics ===
For much of the first quarter of the 20th century, the leading theory of the driving force behind tectonic plate motions envisaged large scale convection currents in the upper mantle, which can be transmitted through the asthenosphere. This theory was launched by Arthur Holmes and some forerunners in the 1930s and was immediately recognized as the solution for the acceptance of the theory as originally discussed in the papers of Alfred Wegener in the early years of the 20th century. However, despite its acceptance, it was long debated in the scientific community because the leading theory still envisaged a static Earth without moving continents up until the major breakthroughs of the early sixties.

Two- and three-dimensional imaging of Earth's interior (seismic tomography) shows a varying lateral density distribution throughout the mantle. Such density variations can be material (from rock chemistry), mineral (from variations in mineral structures), or thermal (through thermal expansion and contraction from heat energy). The manifestation of this varying lateral density is mantle convection from buoyancy forces.

How mantle convection directly and indirectly relates to plate motion is a matter of ongoing study and discussion in geodynamics. Somehow, this energy must be transferred to the lithosphere for tectonic plates to move. There are essentially two main types of mechanisms that are thought to exist related to the dynamics of the mantle that influence plate motion which are primary (through the large scale convection cells) or secondary. The secondary mechanisms view plate motion driven by friction between the convection currents in the asthenosphere and the more rigid overlying lithosphere. This is due to the inflow of mantle material related to the downward pull on plates in subduction zones at ocean trenches. Slab pull may occur in a geodynamic setting where basal tractions continue to act on the plate as it dives into the mantle (although perhaps to a greater extent acting on both the under and upper side of the slab). Furthermore, slabs that are broken off and sink into the mantle can cause viscous mantle forces driving plates through slab suction.

==== Plume tectonics ====
In the theory of plume tectonics followed by numerous researchers during the 1990s, a modified concept of mantle convection currents is used. It asserts that super plumes rise from the deeper mantle and are the drivers or substitutes of the major convection cells. These ideas find their roots in the early 1930s in the works of Beloussov and van Bemmelen, which were initially opposed to plate tectonics and placed the mechanism in a fixed frame of vertical movements. Van Bemmelen later modified the concept in his "Undation Models" and used "Mantle Blisters" as the driving force for horizontal movements, invoking gravitational forces away from the regional crustal doming.

The theories find resonance in the modern theories which envisage hot spots or mantle plumes which remain fixed and are overridden by oceanic and continental lithosphere plates over time and leave their traces in the geological record (though these phenomena are not invoked as real driving mechanisms, but rather as modulators).

The mechanism is still advocated to explain the break-up of supercontinents during specific geological epochs. It has followers amongst the scientists involved in the theory of Earth expansion.

==== Surge tectonics ====
Another theory is that the mantle flows neither in cells nor large plumes but rather as a series of channels just below Earth's crust, which then provide basal friction to the lithosphere. This theory, called "surge tectonics", was popularized during the 1980s and 1990s. Recent research, based on three-dimensional computer modelling, suggests that plate geometry is governed by a feedback between mantle convection patterns and the strength of the lithosphere.

=== Driving forces related to gravity ===
Forces related to gravity are invoked as secondary phenomena within the framework of a more general driving mechanism such as the various forms of mantle dynamics described above. In modern views, gravity is invoked as the major driving force, through slab pull along subduction zones.

Gravitational sliding away from a spreading ridge is one of the proposed driving forces: plate motion is driven by the higher elevation of plates at ocean ridges. As oceanic lithosphere is formed at spreading ridges from hot mantle material, it gradually cools and thickens with age (and thus adds distance from the ridge). Cool oceanic lithosphere is significantly denser than the hot mantle material from which it is derived and so with increasing thickness it gradually subsides into the mantle to compensate the greater load. The result is a slight lateral incline with increased distance from the ridge axis.

This force is regarded as a secondary force and is often referred to as "ridge push". This is a misnomer as there is no force "pushing" horizontally, indeed tensional features are dominant along ridges. It is more accurate to refer to this mechanism as "gravitational sliding", since the topography across the whole plate can vary considerably and spreading ridges are only the most prominent feature. Other mechanisms generating this gravitational secondary force include flexural bulging of the lithosphere before it dives underneath an adjacent plate, producing a clear topographical feature that can offset, or at least affect, the influence of topographical ocean ridges. Mantle plumes and hot spots are also postulated to impinge on the underside of tectonic plates.

Slab pull: Scientific opinion is that the asthenosphere is insufficiently competent or rigid to directly cause motion by friction along the base of the lithosphere. Slab pull is therefore most widely thought to be the greatest force acting on the plates. In this understanding, plate motion is mostly driven by the weight of cold, dense plates sinking into the mantle at trenches. Recent models indicate that trench suction plays an important role as well. However, the fact that the North American plate is nowhere being subducted, although it is in motion, presents a problem. The same holds for the African, Eurasian, and Antarctic plates.

Gravitational sliding away from mantle doming: According to older theories, one of the driving mechanisms of the plates is the existence of large scale asthenosphere/mantle domes, which cause the gravitational sliding of lithosphere plates away from them (see the paragraph on Mantle Mechanisms). This gravitational sliding represents a secondary phenomenon of this basically vertically oriented mechanism. It finds its roots in the Undation Model of van Bemmelen. This can act on various scales, from the small scale of one island arc up to the larger scale of an entire ocean basin.

=== Driving forces related to Earth rotation ===
Alfred Wegener, being a meteorologist, had proposed tidal forces and centrifugal forces as the main driving mechanisms behind continental drift; however, these forces were considered far too small to cause continental motion as the concept was of continents plowing through oceanic crust. Therefore, Wegener later changed his position and asserted that convection currents are the main driving force of plate tectonics in the last edition of his book in 1929.

However, in the plate tectonics context (accepted since the seafloor spreading proposals of Heezen, Hess, Dietz, Morley, Vine, and Matthews (see below) during the early 1960s), the oceanic crust is suggested to be in motion with the continents, which caused the proposals related to Earth rotation to be reconsidered. In more recent literature, these driving forces are:

1. Tidal drag due to the gravitational force the Moon (and the Sun) exerts on the crust of Earth.
2. Global deformation of the geoid due to small displacements of the rotational pole with respect to Earth's crust.
3. Other smaller deformation effects of the crust due to wobbles and spin movements of Earth's rotation on a smaller timescale.

Forces that are small and generally negligible are:

1. The Coriolis force.
2. The centrifugal force, which is treated as a slight modification of gravity.

For these mechanisms to be overall valid, systematic relationships should exist all over the globe between the orientation and kinematics of deformation and the geographical latitudinal and longitudinal grid of Earth itself. Systematic relations studies in the second half of the nineteenth century and the first half of the twentieth century underlined exactly the opposite: that the plates had not moved in time, that the deformation grid was fixed with respect to Earth's equator and axis, and that gravitational driving forces were generally acting vertically and caused only local horizontal movements (the so-called pre-plate tectonic, "fixist theories"). Later studies (discussed below on this page), therefore, invoked many of the relationships recognized during this pre-plate tectonics period to support their theories (see reviews of these various mechanisms related to Earth rotation in the work of van Dijk and collaborators).

==== Possible tidal effect on plate tectonics ====
Of the many forces discussed above, tidal force is still highly debated and defended as a possible principal driving force of plate tectonics. The other forces are only used in global geodynamic models not using plate tectonics concepts (therefore beyond the discussions treated in this section) or proposed as minor modulations within the overall plate tectonics model. In 1973, George W. Moore of the USGS and R. C. Bostrom presented evidence for a general westward drift of Earth's lithosphere with respect to the mantle, based on the steepness of the subduction zones (shallow dipping towards the east, steeply dipping towards the west). They concluded that tidal forces (the tidal lag or "friction") caused by Earth's rotation and the forces acting upon it by the Moon are a driving force for plate tectonics. As Earth spins eastward beneath the Moon, the Moon's gravity ever so slightly pulls Earth's surface layer back westward, just as proposed by Alfred Wegener (see above). Since 1990 this theory has been mainly advocated by Doglioni and co-workers (Doglioni 1990), such as in a more recent 2006 study, where scientists reviewed and advocated these ideas. It has been suggested in Lovett (2006) that this observation may also explain why Venus and Mars have no plate tectonics, as Venus has no moon and Mars' moons are too small to have significant tidal effects on the planet. In a paper by Torsvik et al., it was suggested that, on the other hand, it can easily be observed that many plates are moving north and eastward, and that the dominantly westward motion of the Pacific Ocean basins derives simply from the eastward bias of the Pacific spreading center (which is not a predicted manifestation of such lunar forces). In the same paper the authors admit, however, that relative to the lower mantle, there is a slight westward component in the motions of all the plates. They demonstrated though that the westward drift, seen only for the past 30 Ma, is attributed to the increased dominance of the steadily growing and accelerating Pacific plate. The debate is still open, and a 2022 paper by Hofmeister et al. revived the idea of the interaction between Earth's rotation and the Moon as the main driving force for plate movement.

=== Role of water ===
The role of water has traditionally been proposed to be crucial in plate tectonics on Earth, because it lowers viscosities in the asthenosphere, enabling subduction. However, this has been put into question at times.

=== Relative significance of each driving force mechanism ===
The vector of a plate's motion is a function of all the forces acting on the plate; however, therein lies the problem regarding the degree to which each process contributes to the overall motion of each tectonic plate.

The diversity of geodynamic settings and the properties of each plate result from the impact of the various processes actively driving each individual plate. One method of dealing with this problem is to consider the relative rate at which each plate is moving as well as the evidence related to the significance of each process to the overall driving force on the plate.

One of the most significant correlations discovered to date is that lithospheric plates attached to downgoing (subducting) plates move much faster than other types of plates. The Pacific plate, for instance, is essentially surrounded by zones of subduction (the so-called Ring of Fire) and moves much faster than the plates of the Atlantic basin, which are attached (perhaps one could say 'welded') to adjacent continents instead of subducting plates. It is thus thought that forces associated with the downgoing plate (slab pull and slab suction) are the driving forces which determine the motion of plates, except for those plates which are not being subducted. This view however has been contradicted by a recent study which found that the actual motions of the Pacific plate and other plates associated with the East Pacific Rise do not correlate mainly with either slab pull or slab push, but rather with a mantle convection upwelling whose horizontal spreading along the bases of the various plates drives them along via viscosity-related traction forces. The driving forces of plate motion continue to be active subjects of on-going research within geophysics and tectonophysics.

== History of the theory ==
=== Summary ===
Detailed map showing the tectonic plates with their movement vectors.

The development of the theory of plate tectonics was the scientific and cultural change which occurred during a period of 50 years of scientific debate. The event of the acceptance itself was a paradigm shift and can therefore be classified as a scientific revolution, now described as the Plate Tectonics Revolution.

Around the start of the twentieth century, various theorists unsuccessfully attempted to explain the many geographical, geological, and biological continuities between continents. In 1912, the meteorologist Alfred Wegener described what he called continental drift, an idea that culminated fifty years later in the modern theory of plate tectonics.

Wegener expanded his theory in his 1915 book The Origin of Continents and Oceans. Starting from the idea (also expressed by his forerunners) that the present continents once formed a single land mass (later called Pangaea), Wegener suggested that these separated and drifted apart, likening them to "icebergs" of low density sial floating on a sea of denser sima. Supporting evidence for the idea came from the dove-tailing outlines of South America's east coast and Africa's west coast Antonio Snider-Pellegrini had drawn on his maps, and from the matching of the rock formations along these edges. Confirmation of their previous contiguous nature also came from the fossil plants Glossopteris and Gangamopteris, and the therapsid or mammal-like reptile Lystrosaurus, all widely distributed over South America, Africa, Antarctica, India, and Australia. The evidence for such an erstwhile joining of these continents was patent to field geologists working in the southern hemisphere. The South African Alex du Toit put together a mass of such information in his 1937 publication Our Wandering Continents, and went further than Wegener in recognising the strong links between the Gondwana fragments.

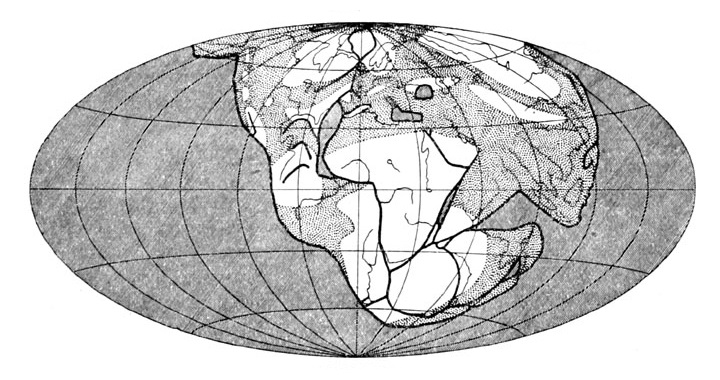
A paleomap drawn by Wegener to illustrate his concept.

Wegener's work was initially not widely accepted, in part due to a lack of detailed evidence but mostly because of the lack of a reasonable physically supported mechanism. Earth might have a solid crust and mantle and a liquid core, but there seemed to be no way that portions of the crust could move around. Many distinguished scientists of the time, such as Harold Jeffreys and Charles Schuchert, were outspoken critics of continental drift.

Despite much opposition, the view of continental drift gained support and a lively debate started between "drifters" or "mobilists" (proponents of the theory) and "fixists" (opponents). During the 1920s, 1930s and 1940s, the former reached important milestones proposing that convection currents might have driven the plate movements, and that spreading may have occurred below the sea within the oceanic crust. Concepts close to the elements of plate tectonics were proposed by geophysicists and geologists (both fixists and mobilists) like Vening-Meinesz, Holmes, and Umbgrove. In 1941, Otto Ampferer described, in his publication "Thoughts on the motion picture of the Atlantic region", processes that anticipated seafloor spreading and subduction. One of the first pieces of geophysical evidence that was used to support the movement of lithospheric plates came from paleomagnetism. This is based on the fact that rocks of different ages show a variable magnetic field direction, evidenced by studies since the mid–nineteenth century. The magnetic north and south poles reverse through time, and, especially important in paleotectonic studies, the relative position of the magnetic north pole varies through time. Initially, during the first half of the twentieth century, the latter phenomenon was explained by introducing what was called "polar wander" (see apparent polar wander) (i.e., it was assumed that the north pole location had been shifting through time). An alternative explanation, though, was that the continents had moved (shifted and rotated) relative to the north pole, and each continent, in fact, shows its own "polar wander path". During the late 1950s, it was successfully shown on two occasions that these data could show the validity of continental drift: by Keith Runcorn in a paper in 1956, and by Warren Carey in a symposium held in March 1956.

The second piece of evidence in support of continental drift came during the late 1950s and early 60s from data on the bathymetry of the deep ocean floors and the nature of the oceanic crust such as magnetic properties and, more generally, with the development of marine geology which gave evidence for the association of seafloor spreading along the mid-oceanic ridges and magnetic field reversals, published between 1959 and 1963 by Heezen, Dietz, Hess, Mason, Vine & Matthews, and Morley.

Simultaneous advances in early seismic imaging techniques in and around Wadati–Benioff zones along the trenches bounding many continental margins, together with many other geophysical (e.g., gravimetric) and geological observations, showed how the oceanic crust could disappear into the mantle, providing the mechanism to balance the extension of the ocean basins with shortening along its margins.

All this evidence, both from the ocean floor and from the continental margins, made it clear around 1965 that continental drift was feasible. The theory of plate tectonics was defined in a series of papers between 1965 and 1967. The theory revolutionized the Earth sciences, explaining a diverse range of geological phenomena and their implications in other studies such as paleogeography and paleobiology.

=== Continental drift ===
In the late 19th and early 20th centuries, geologists assumed that Earth's major features were fixed, and that most geologic features such as basin development and mountain ranges could be explained by vertical crustal movement, described in what is called the geosynclinal theory. Generally, this was placed in the context of a contracting planet Earth due to heat loss in the course of a relatively short geological time.

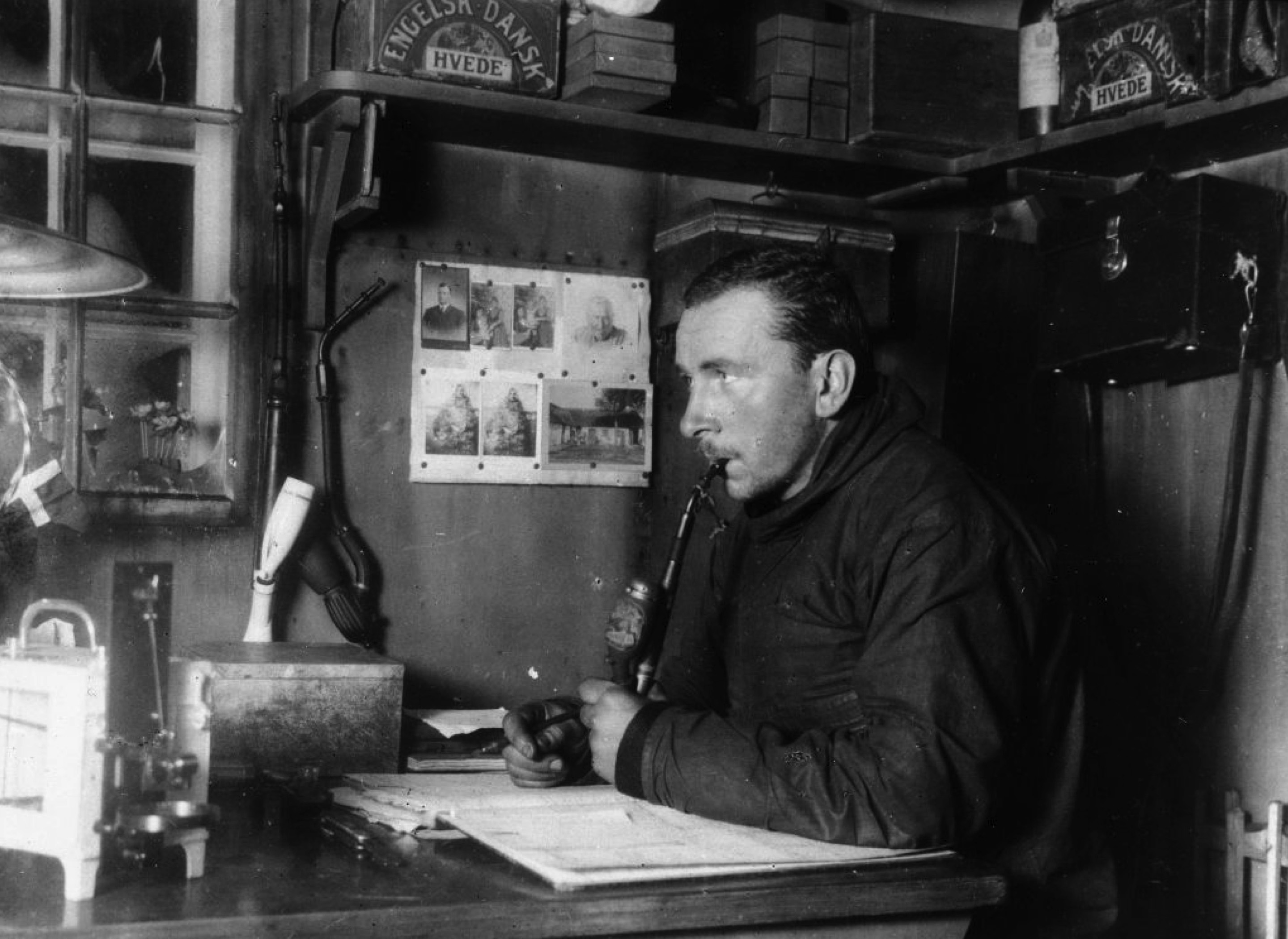
Alfred Wegener in Greenland in the winter of 1912–13.

It was observed as early as 1596 that the opposite coasts of the Atlantic Ocean—or, more precisely, the edges of the continental shelves—have similar shapes and seem to have once fitted together.

Since that time, many theories were proposed to explain this apparent complementarity, but the assumption of a solid Earth made these various proposals difficult to accept.

The discovery of radioactivity and its associated heating properties in 1896 prompted a re-examination of the apparent age of Earth. This had previously been estimated by its cooling rate under the assumption that Earth's surface radiated like a black body. Those calculations had implied that, even if it started at red heat, Earth would have dropped to its present temperature in a few tens of millions of years. Armed with the knowledge of a new heat source, scientists realized that Earth would be much older, and that its core was still sufficiently hot to be liquid.

By 1915, after having published a first article in 1912, Alfred Wegener was making serious arguments for the idea of continental drift in the first edition of The Origin of Continents and Oceans. In that book (re-issued in four successive editions up to the final one in 1936), he noted how the east coast of South America and the west coast of Africa looked as if they were once attached. Wegener was not the first to note this (Abraham Ortelius, Antonio Snider-Pellegrini, Eduard Suess, Roberto Mantovani and Frank Bursley Taylor preceded him just to mention a few), but he was the first to marshal significant fossil and paleo-topographical and climatological evidence to support this simple observation (and was supported in this by researchers such as Alex du Toit). Furthermore, when the rock strata of the margins of separate continents are very similar it suggests that these rocks were formed in the same way, implying that they were joined initially. For instance, parts of Scotland and Ireland contain rocks very similar to those found in Newfoundland and New Brunswick. Furthermore, the Caledonian Mountains of Europe and parts of the Appalachian Mountains of North America are very similar in structure and lithology.

However, his ideas were not taken seriously by many geologists, who pointed out that there was no apparent mechanism for continental drift. Specifically, they did not see how continental rock could plow through the much denser rock that makes up oceanic crust. Wegener could not explain the force that drove continental drift, and his vindication did not come until after his death in 1930.

=== Floating continents, paleomagnetism, and seismicity zones ===
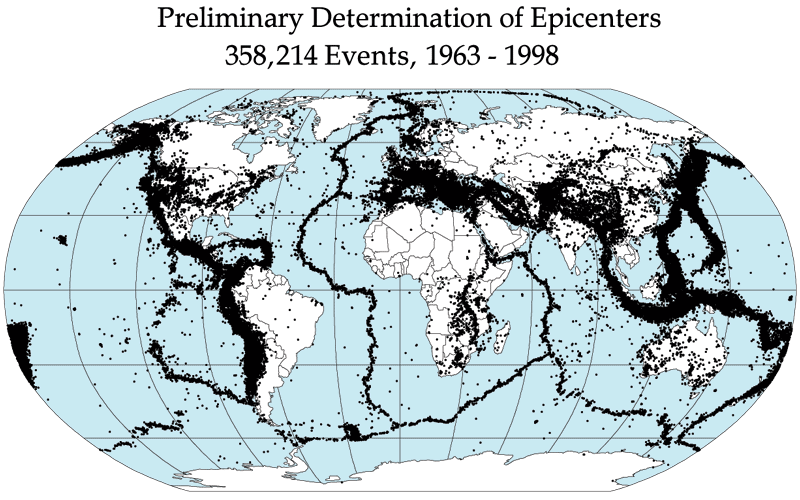
Global earthquake epicenters, 1963–1998. Most earthquakes occur in narrow belts that correspond to the locations of lithospheric plate boundaries.

Map of earthquakes in 2016

As it was observed early that although granite existed on continents, seafloor seemed to be composed of denser basalt, the prevailing concept during the first half of the twentieth century was that there were two types of crust, named "sial" (continental type crust) and "sima" (oceanic type crust). Furthermore, it was supposed that a static shell of strata was present under the continents. It therefore looked apparent that a layer of basalt (sial) underlies the continental rocks.

However, based on abnormalities in plumb line deflection by the Andes in Peru, Pierre Bouguer had deduced that less-dense mountains must have a downward projection into the denser layer underneath. The concept that mountains had "roots" was confirmed by George B. Airy a hundred years later, during study of Himalayan gravitation, and seismic studies detected corresponding density variations. Therefore, by the mid-1950s, the question remained unresolved as to whether mountain roots were clenched in surrounding basalt or were floating on it like an iceberg.

During the 20th century, improvements in and greater use of seismic instruments such as seismographs enabled scientists to learn that earthquakes tend to be concentrated in specific areas, most notably along the oceanic trenches and spreading ridges. By the late 1920s, seismologists were beginning to identify several prominent earthquake zones parallel to the trenches that typically were inclined 40–60° from the horizontal and extended several hundred kilometers into Earth. These zones later became known as Wadati–Benioff zones, or simply Benioff zones, in honor of the seismologists who first recognized them, Kiyoo Wadati of Japan and Hugo Benioff of the United States. The study of global seismicity greatly advanced in the 1960s with the establishment of the Worldwide Standardized Seismograph Network (WWSSN) to monitor the compliance of the 1963 treaty banning above-ground testing of nuclear weapons. The much improved data from the WWSSN instruments allowed seismologists to map precisely the zones of earthquake concentration worldwide.

Meanwhile, debates developed around the phenomenon of polar wander. Since the early debates of continental drift, scientists had discussed and used evidence that polar drift had occurred because continents seemed to have moved through different climatic zones during the past. Furthermore, paleomagnetic data had shown that the magnetic pole had also shifted during time. Reasoning in an opposite way, the continents might have shifted and rotated, while the pole remained relatively fixed. The first time the evidence of magnetic polar wander was used to support the movements of continents was in a paper by Keith Runcorn in 1956, and successive papers by him and his students Ted Irving (who was actually the first to be convinced of the fact that paleomagnetism supported continental drift) and Ken Creer.

This was immediately followed by a symposium on continental drift in Tasmania in March 1956 organised by S. Warren Carey who had been one of the supporters and promotors of Continental Drift since the thirties During this symposium, some of the participants used the evidence in the theory of an expansion of the global crust, a theory which had been proposed by other workers decades earlier. In this hypothesis, the shifting of the continents is explained by a large increase in the size of Earth since its formation. However, although the theory still has supporters in science, this is generally regarded as unsatisfactory because there is no convincing mechanism to produce a significant expansion of Earth. Other work during the following years would soon show that the evidence was equally in support of continental drift on a globe with a stable radius.

During the 1930s up to the late 1950s, works by Vening-Meinesz, Holmes, Umbgrove, and numerous others outlined concepts that were close or nearly identical to modern plate tectonics theory. In particular, the English geologist Arthur Holmes proposed in 1920 that plate junctions might lie beneath the sea, and in 1928 that convection currents within the mantle might be the driving force. Often, these contributions are forgotten because:

- At the time, continental drift was not accepted.
- Some of these ideas were discussed in the context of abandoned fixist ideas of a deforming globe without continental drift or an expanding Earth.
- They were published during an episode of extreme political and economic instability that hampered scientific communication.
- Many were published by European scientists and at first not mentioned or given little credit in the papers on sea floor spreading published by the American researchers in the 1960s.

=== Mid-oceanic ridge spreading and convection ===
In 1947, a team of scientists led by Maurice Ewing utilizing the Woods Hole Oceanographic Institution's research vessel Atlantis and an array of instruments, confirmed the existence of a rise in the central Atlantic Ocean, and found that the floor of the seabed beneath the layer of sediments consisted of basalt, not the granite which is the main constituent of continents. They also found that the oceanic crust was much thinner than continental crust. All these new findings raised important and intriguing questions.

The new data that had been collected on the ocean basins also showed particular characteristics regarding the bathymetry. One of the major outcomes of these datasets was that all along the globe, a system of mid-oceanic ridges was detected. An important conclusion was that along this system, new ocean floor was being created, which led to the concept of the "Great Global Rift". This was described in the crucial paper of Bruce Heezen (1960) based on his work with Marie Tharp, which would trigger a real revolution in thinking. A profound consequence of seafloor spreading is that new crust was, and still is, being continually created along the oceanic ridges. For this reason, Heezen initially advocated the so-called "expanding Earth" hypothesis of S. Warren Carey (see above). Therefore, the question remained as to how new crust could continuously be added along the oceanic ridges without increasing the size of Earth. In reality, this question had been solved already by numerous scientists during the 1940s and the 1950s, like Arthur Holmes, Vening-Meinesz, Coates and many others: The crust in excess disappeared along what were called the oceanic trenches, where so-called "subduction" occurred. Therefore, when various scientists during the early 1960s started to reason on the data at their disposal regarding the ocean floor, the pieces of the theory quickly fell into place.

The question particularly intrigued Harry Hammond Hess, a Princeton University geologist and a Naval Reserve Rear Admiral, and Robert S. Dietz, a scientist with the United States Coast and Geodetic Survey who coined the term seafloor spreading. Dietz and Hess (the former published the same idea one year earlier in Nature, but priority belongs to Hess who had already distributed an unpublished manuscript of his 1962 article by 1960) were among the small number who really understood the broad implications of sea floor spreading and how it would eventually agree with the, at that time, unconventional and unaccepted ideas of continental drift and the elegant and mobilistic models proposed by previous workers like Holmes.

In the same year, Robert R. Coats of the U.S. Geological Survey described the main features of island arc subduction in the Aleutian Islands. His paper, though little noted (and sometimes even ridiculed) at the time, has since been called "seminal" and "prescient". In reality, it shows that the work by the European scientists on island arcs and mountain belts performed and published during the 1930s up until the 1950s was applied and appreciated also in the United States.

If Earth's crust was expanding along the oceanic ridges, Hess and Dietz reasoned like Holmes and others before them, it must be shrinking elsewhere. Hess followed Heezen, suggesting that new oceanic crust continuously spreads away from the ridges in a conveyor belt–like motion. And, using the mobilistic concepts developed before, he correctly concluded that many millions of years later, the oceanic crust eventually descends along the continental margins where oceanic trenches—very deep, narrow canyons—are formed, e.g. along the rim of the Pacific Ocean basin. The important step Hess made was that convection currents would be the driving force in this process, arriving at the same conclusions as Holmes had decades before with the only difference that the thinning of the ocean crust was performed using Heezen's mechanism of spreading along the ridges. Hess therefore concluded that the Atlantic Ocean was expanding while the Pacific Ocean was shrinking. As old oceanic crust is "consumed" in the trenches (like Holmes and others, he thought this was done by thickening of the continental lithosphere, not, as later understood, by underthrusting at a larger scale of the oceanic crust itself into the mantle), new magma rises and erupts along the spreading ridges to form new crust. In effect, the ocean basins are perpetually being "recycled", with the forming of new crust and the destruction of old oceanic lithosphere occurring simultaneously. Thus, the new mobilistic concepts neatly explained why Earth does not get bigger with sea floor spreading, why there is so little sediment accumulation on the ocean floor, and why oceanic rocks are much younger than continental rocks.

=== Magnetic striping ===
Seafloor magnetic striping

A demonstration of magnetic striping. The darker the color is, the closer it is to normal polarity.

Beginning in the 1950s, scientists like Victor Vacquier, using magnetic instruments (magnetometers) adapted from airborne devices developed during World War II to detect submarines, began recognizing odd magnetic variations across the ocean floor. This finding, though unexpected, was not entirely surprising because it was known that basalt—the iron-rich, volcanic rock making up the ocean floor—contains a strongly magnetic mineral (magnetite) and can locally distort compass readings. This distortion was recognized by Icelandic mariners as early as the late 18th century. More importantly, because the presence of magnetite gives the basalt measurable magnetic properties, these newly discovered magnetic variations provided another means to study the deep ocean floor. When newly formed rock cools, such magnetic materials recorded Earth's magnetic field at the time.

As more and more of the seafloor was mapped during the 1950s, the magnetic variations turned out not to be random or isolated occurrences, but instead revealed recognizable patterns. When these magnetic patterns were mapped over a wide region, the ocean floor showed a zebra-like pattern: one stripe with normal polarity and the adjoining stripe with reversed polarity. The overall pattern, defined by these alternating bands of normally and reversely polarized rock, became known as magnetic striping, and was published by Ron G. Mason and co-workers in 1961, who did not find, though, an explanation for these data in terms of sea floor spreading, like Vine, Matthews and Morley a few years later.

The discovery of magnetic striping called for an explanation. In the early 1960s, scientists such as Heezen, Hess and Dietz had begun to theorise that mid-ocean ridges mark structurally weak zones where the ocean floor was being ripped in two lengthwise along the ridge crest (see the previous paragraph). New magma from deep within Earth rises easily through these weak zones and eventually erupts along the crest of the ridges to create new oceanic crust. This process, at first denominated the "conveyer belt hypothesis" and later called seafloor spreading, operating over many millions of years continues to form new ocean floor all across the 50,000 km-long system of mid-ocean ridges.

Only four years after the maps with the "zebra pattern" of magnetic stripes were published, the link between sea floor spreading and these patterns was recognized independently by Lawrence Morley, and by Fred Vine and Drummond Matthews, in 1963, (the Vine–Matthews–Morley hypothesis). This hypothesis linked these patterns to geomagnetic reversals and was supported by several lines of evidence:

1. the stripes are symmetrical around the crests of the mid-ocean ridges; at or near the crest of the ridge, the rocks are very young, and they become progressively older away from the ridge crest;
2. the youngest rocks at the ridge crest always have modern (normal) polarity;
3. stripes of rock parallel to the ridge crest alternate in magnetic polarity (normal-reversed-normal, etc.), suggesting that they were formed during different epochs documenting the (already known from independent studies) normal and reversal episodes of Earth's magnetic field.

By explaining both the zebra-like magnetic striping and the construction of the mid-ocean ridge system, the seafloor spreading hypothesis (SFS) quickly gained converts and represented another major advance in the development of the plate-tectonics theory. Furthermore, the oceanic crust came to be appreciated as a natural "tape recording" of the history of the geomagnetic field reversals (GMFR) of Earth's magnetic field. Extensive studies were dedicated to the calibration of the normal-reversal patterns in the oceanic crust on one hand and known timescales derived from the dating of basalt layers in sedimentary sequences (magnetostratigraphy) on the other, to arrive at estimates of past spreading rates and plate reconstructions.

=== Definition and refining of the theory ===
After all these considerations, plate tectonics (or, as it was initially called "New Global Tectonics") became quickly accepted and numerous papers followed that defined the concepts:

- In 1965, Tuzo Wilson who had been a promoter of the sea floor spreading hypothesis and continental drift from the very beginning added the concept of transform faults to the model, completing the classes of fault types necessary to make the mobility of the plates on the globe work out.
- A symposium on continental drift was held at the Royal Society of London in 1965 which must be regarded as the official start of the acceptance of plate tectonics by the scientific community, and which abstracts are issued as Blackett, Bullard & Runcorn (1965). In this symposium, Edward Bullard and co-workers showed with a computer calculation how the continents along both sides of the Atlantic would best fit to close the ocean, which became known as the famous "Bullard's Fit".
- In 1966 Wilson published the paper that referred to previous plate tectonic reconstructions, introducing the concept of what became known as the "Wilson Cycle".
- In 1967, at the American Geophysical Union's meeting, W. Jason Morgan proposed that Earth's surface consists of 12 rigid plates that move relative to each other.
- Two months later, Xavier Le Pichon published a complete model based on six major plates with their relative motions, which marked the final acceptance by the scientific community of plate tectonics.
- In the same year, McKenzie and Parker independently presented a model similar to Morgan's using translations and rotations on a sphere to define the plate motions.
- From that moment onwards, discussions have been focusing on the relative role of the forces driving plate tectonics, in order to evolve from a kinematic concept into a dynamic theory. Initially these concepts were focused on mantle convection, in the footsteps of A. Holmes, and also introduced the importance of the gravitational pull of subducted slabs through the works of Elsasser, Solomon, Sleep, Uyeda and Turcotte. Other authors evoked external driving forces due to the tidal drag of the Moon and other celestial bodies, and, especially since 2000, with the emergence of computational models reproducing Earth's mantle behaviour to first order, following upon the older unifying concepts of van Bemmelen, authors re-evaluated the important role of mantle dynamics.

== Implications for life ==
According to a hypothesis proposed by Robert Stern and Taras Gerya, plate tectonics are a necessary criterion for a planet to be able to sustain complex life because of the role plate tectonics plays in regulating the carbon cycle.

Continental drift theory helps biogeographers to explain the disjunct biogeographic distribution of present-day life found on different continents but having similar ancestors.

== Plate reconstruction ==
Reconstruction is used to establish past (and future) plate configurations, helping determine the shape and make-up of ancient supercontinents and providing a basis for paleogeography.

=== Defining plate boundaries ===
Active plate boundaries are defined by their seismicity. Past plate boundaries within existing plates are identified from a variety of evidence, such as the presence of ophiolites that are indicative of vanished oceans.

=== Emergence of plate tectonics and past plate motions ===
The timing of the emergence of plate tectonics on Earth has been the subject of considerable controversy, with the estimated time varying wildly between researchers, spanning 85% of Earth's history. Some authors have suggested that during at least part of the Archean period (~4-2.5 billion years ago) the mantle was between 100 and 250 °C warmer than at present, which is thought to be incompatible with modern-style plate tectonics, and that Earth may have had a stagnant lid or other kinds of regimes. The increasingly felsic nature of preserved rocks between 3 and 2.5 billion years ago implies that subduction zones had emerged by this time, with preserved zircons suggesting that subduction may have begun as early as 3.8 billion years ago. Early subduction zones appear to have been temporary and localized, though to what degree is controversial. Modern plate tectonics are suggested to have emerged by at least 2.2 billion years ago with the formation of the first recognised supercontinent Columbia, though some authors have suggested that modern-style plate tectonics did not appear until 800 million years ago based on the late appearance of rock types like blueschist which require cold subducted material. Other authors have suggested that plate tectonics were already functional in the Hadean, over 4 billion years ago.

Animation of a full-plate tectonic model extended one billion years into the past Convergent boundary Divergent boundary Transform boundary Arrows point to the upthrown side Continental crust (older crust) Continental crust (younger crust) Oceanic crust

Various types of quantitative and semi-quantitative information are available to constrain past plate motions. The geometric fit between continents, such as between west Africa and South America is still an important part of plate reconstruction. Magnetic stripe patterns provide a reliable guide to relative plate motions going back into the Jurassic period. The tracks of hotspots give absolute reconstructions, but these are only available back to the Cretaceous. Older reconstructions rely mainly on paleomagnetic pole data, although these only constrain the latitude and rotation, but not the longitude. Combining poles of different ages in a particular plate to produce apparent polar wander paths provides a method for comparing the motions of different plates through time. Additional evidence comes from the distribution of certain sedimentary rock types, faunal provinces shown by particular fossil groups, and the position of orogenic belts.

==== Formation and break-up of continents ====
The movement of plates has caused the formation and break-up of continents over time, including occasional formation of a supercontinent that contains most or all of the continents. The supercontinent Columbia or Nuna formed during a period of 2,000 to 1,800 million years ago and broke up about 1,500 to 1,300 million years ago. The supercontinent Rodinia is thought to have formed about 1 billion years ago and to have embodied most or all of Earth's continents, and broken up into eight continents around 600 million years ago. The eight continents later re-assembled into another supercontinent called Pangaea; Pangaea broke up into Laurasia (which became North America and Eurasia) and Gondwana (which became the remaining continents).

The Himalayas, the world's tallest mountain range, are assumed to have been formed by the collision of two major plates. Before uplift, the area where they stand was covered by the Tethys Ocean.

== Modern plates ==
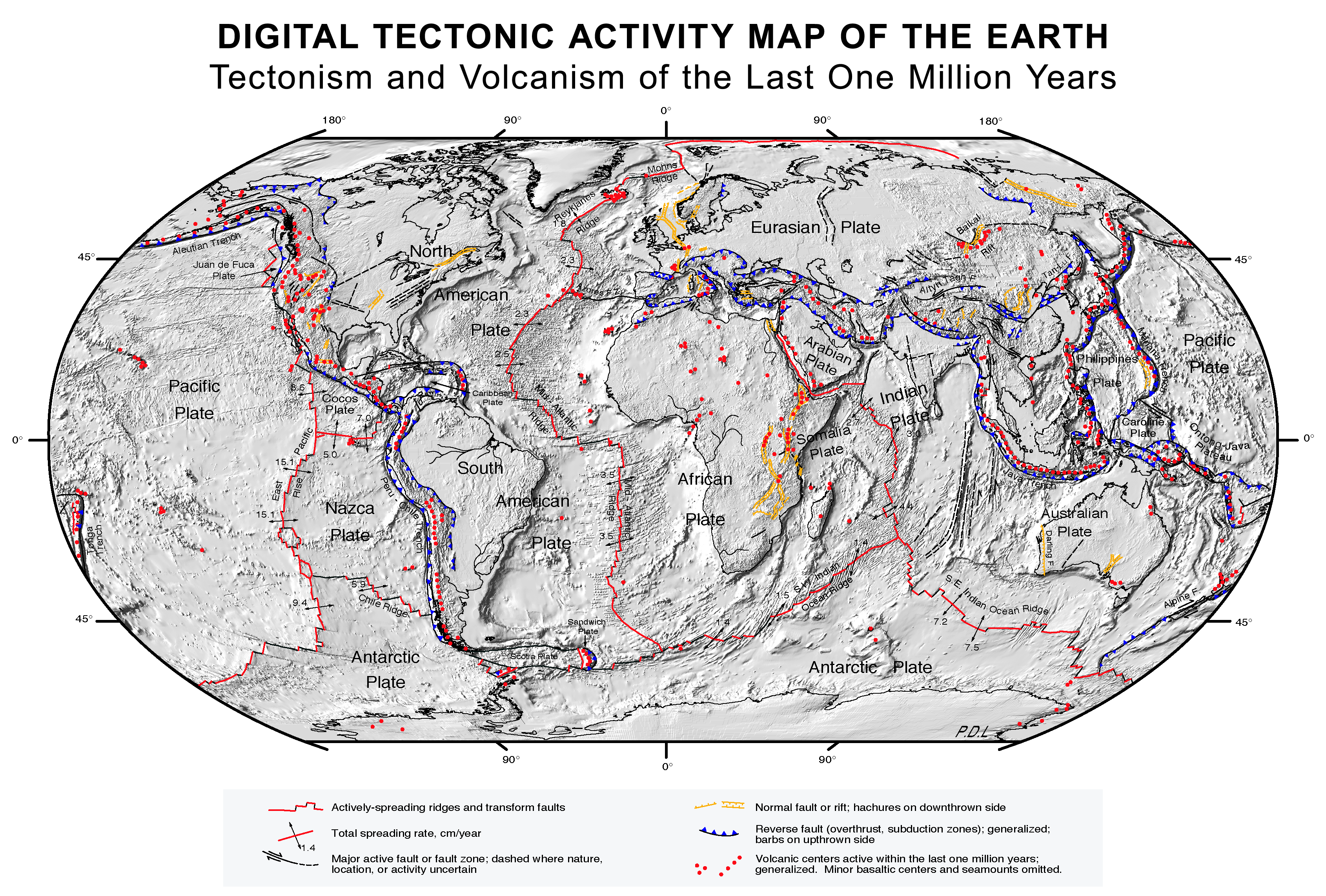
Plate tectonics map

Depending on how they are defined, there are usually seven or eight "major" plates: African, Antarctic, Eurasian, North American, South American, Pacific, and Indo-Australian. The latter is sometimes subdivided into the Indian and Australian plates.

There are dozens of smaller plates, the eight largest of which are the Arabian, Caribbean, Juan de Fuca, Cocos, Nazca, Philippine Sea, Scotia and Somali.

During the 2020s, new proposals have come forward that divide Earth's crust into many smaller plates, called terranes, which reflects the fact that Plate reconstructions show that the larger plates have been internally deformed and oceanic and continental plates have been fragmented over time. This has resulted in the definition of roughly 1200 terranes inside the oceanic plates, continental blocks and the mobile zones (mountainous belts) that separate them.

The motion of the tectonic plates is determined by remote sensing satellite data sets, calibrated with ground station measurements.

== Other celestial bodies ==
The appearance of plate tectonics on terrestrial planets is related to planetary mass, with more massive planets than Earth expected to exhibit plate tectonics. Earth may be a borderline case, owing its tectonic activity to abundant water (silica and water form a deep eutectic).

=== Venus ===
Venus shows no evidence of active plate tectonics. There is debatable evidence of active tectonics in the planet's distant past; however, events taking place since then (such as the plausible and generally accepted hypothesis that the Venusian lithosphere has thickened greatly over the course of several hundred million years) has made constraining the course of its geologic record difficult. However, the numerous well-preserved impact craters have been used as a dating method to approximately date the Venusian surface (since there are thus far no known samples of Venusian rock to be dated by more reliable methods). Dates derived are dominantly in the range 500 to 750 million years ago, although ages of up to 1,200 million years ago have been calculated. This research has led to the fairly well accepted hypothesis that Venus has undergone an essentially complete volcanic resurfacing at least once in its distant past, with the last event taking place approximately within the range of estimated surface ages. While the mechanism of such an impressive thermal event remains a debated issue in Venusian geosciences, some scientists are advocates of processes involving plate motion to some extent.

One explanation for Venus's lack of plate tectonics is that on Venus temperatures are too high for significant water to be present. Earth's crust is soaked with water, and water plays an important role in the development of shear zones. Plate tectonics requires weak surfaces in the crust along which crustal slices can move, and it may well be that such weakening never took place on Venus because of the absence of water. However, some researchers remain convinced that plate tectonics is or was once active on this planet.

=== Mars ===
Mars is considerably smaller than Earth and Venus, and there is evidence for ice on its surface and in its crust.

In the 1990s, it was proposed that Martian Crustal Dichotomy was created by plate tectonic processes. Scientists have since determined that it was created either by upwelling within the Martian mantle that thickened the crust of the Southern Highlands and formed Tharsis or by a giant impact that excavated the Northern Lowlands.

Valles Marineris may be a tectonic boundary.

Observations made of the magnetic field of Mars by the Mars Global Surveyor spacecraft in 1999 showed patterns of magnetic striping discovered on this planet. Some scientists interpreted these as requiring plate tectonic processes, such as seafloor spreading. However, their data failed a "magnetic reversal test", which is used to see if they were formed by flipping polarities of a global magnetic field.

=== Icy moons ===
Some of the satellites of Jupiter have features that may be related to plate-tectonic style deformation, although the materials and specific mechanisms may be different from plate-tectonic activity on Earth. On 8 September 2014, NASA reported finding evidence of plate tectonics on Europa, a satellite of Jupiter—the first sign of subduction activity on another world other than Earth. Titan, the largest moon of Saturn, was reported to show tectonic activity in images taken by the Huygens probe, which landed on Titan on January 14, 2005.

The mechanisms of plate tectonics on icy moons, particularly Earth-like plate tectonics are not widely agreed upon or well understood. Plate tectonics on Earth is hypothesized to be driven by “slab pull,” where the sinking of the more dense subducting plate provides the spreading force for mid-ocean ridges. “Ridge push” is comparatively weak in Earth's plate tectonics. Extensional features are abundant on icy moons, but compressional features are sparse. Furthermore, subducting less dense ice into a more dense fluid is difficult to explain. Force balance modeling suggests that subduction is likely to create large scale topographic forcing across icy moons, because the buoyant force is orders of magnitude greater than subducting forces. Fracturing and plate-like motion is more easily explained by volume changes and ice-shell motion that is decoupled from interior motion.

=== Exoplanets ===
On Earth-sized planets, plate tectonics is more likely if there are oceans of water. However, in 2007, two independent teams of researchers came to opposing conclusions about the likelihood of plate tectonics on larger super-Earths with one team saying that plate tectonics would be episodic or stagnant and the other team saying that plate tectonics is very likely on super-earths even if the planet is dry.

Consideration of plate tectonics is a part of the search for extraterrestrial intelligence and extraterrestrial life.

== See also ==
- Atmospheric circulation – Process which distributes thermal energy about Earth's surface
- Conservation of angular momentum – Conserved physical quantity; rotational analogue of linear momentum
- Geological history of Earth
- Geosyncline – Obsolete geological concept to explain orogens
- GPlates – Open-source application software for interactive plate-tectonic reconstructions
- List of submarine topographical features
- Outline of plate tectonics – Hierarchical outline list of articles related to plate tectonics
- Supercontinent cycle – Repeated joining and separation of Earth's continents
- Tectonics – Process of evolution of Earth's crust
