= Ebeltofthamna =

Bay in Svalbard, Norway

Coordinates: 79°09′15″N 11°35′00″E

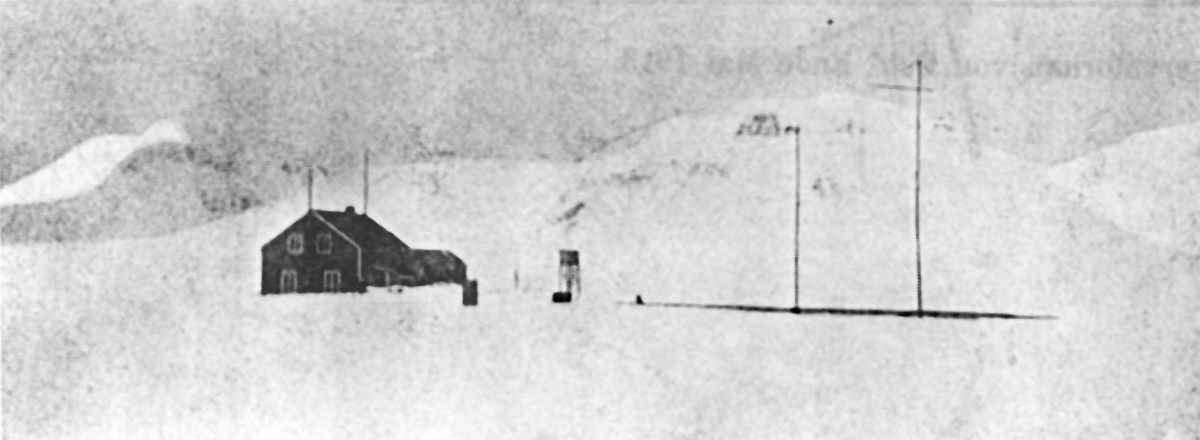
Historical photo from 1913, of the observatory of the Crossbai-expedition of Max Robitzsch and Kurt Wegener

Ebeltofthamna is a bay in the peninsula of Mitrahalvøya, at the western side of Krossfjorden in Albert I Land at Spitsbergen, Svalbard. The bay is named after lawyer Adolph Ferdinand Ebeltoft.

The bay is included in the Nordvest-Spitsbergen National Park, and is rich in cultural heritage from several historical periods. These include reminiscents from the whaling period, hunting activity, and research activity.
