= Max Robitzsch =

German meteorologist and professor (1877–1952)

Max Robitzsch (2 February 1887 – 10 June 1952) was a German meteorological scientist and university professor. He invented the "Robitzsch Actinograph", a type of pyranometer and wrote numerous scientific books and articles.

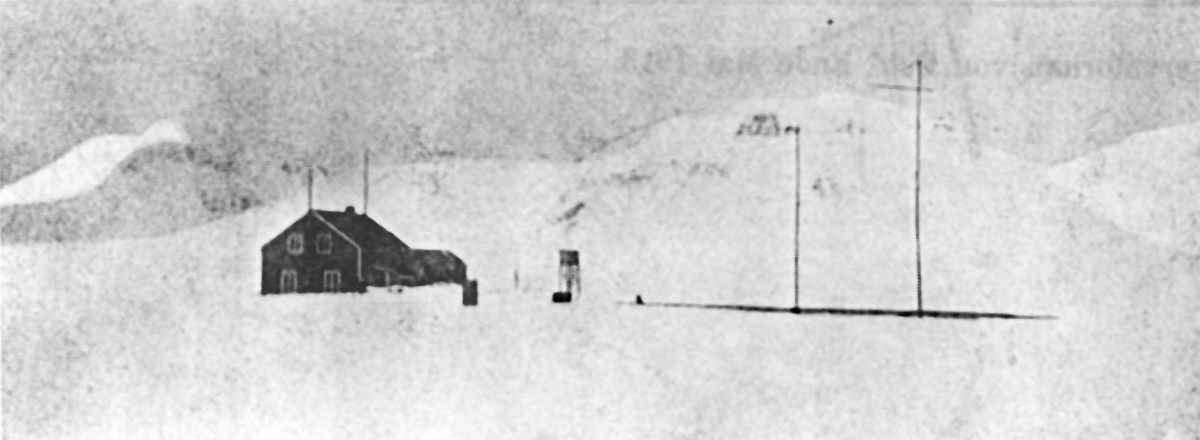
Historical photo of the Spitsbergen observatory.

He was born in Höxter, Province of Westphalia. He also undertook an expedition into the Scandinavian arctic to research atmospheric phenomena, spending the 1912/1913 winter in Spitsbergen, Norway. His mission, together with Kurt Wegener, brother of Alfred Wegener, was to set up a meteorological observatory for the German Geophysical Observatory, which they did at the Crossbai, Ebeltofthafen (Ebeltofthamna in Norwegian). During the long winter stay, they and two helpers performed 275 pilot balloon soundings, 98 tethered balloon soundings and 19 probe launches with the help of a hang glider. As of 2000, only some archeological remains of the obersvatory could be found.

For much of his life (since at least 1917), he worked as a professor at the Meteorological Observatory Lindenberg (German Wikipedia) in Lindenberg, Brandenburg. During the Cold War, he there undertook numerous extensive radio sounding studies of the atmosphere with weather balloons, reputedly at the behalf of the Soviet occupation forces in East Germany.

During January to May 1950, he was director of the Meteorologisches Observatorium Lindenberg, before later on becoming professor at (and possibly the director of) the Geophysical Institute of Leipzig, later subsumed in the University of Leipzig.
