= Fritz Loewe =

German polar explorer and meteorologist

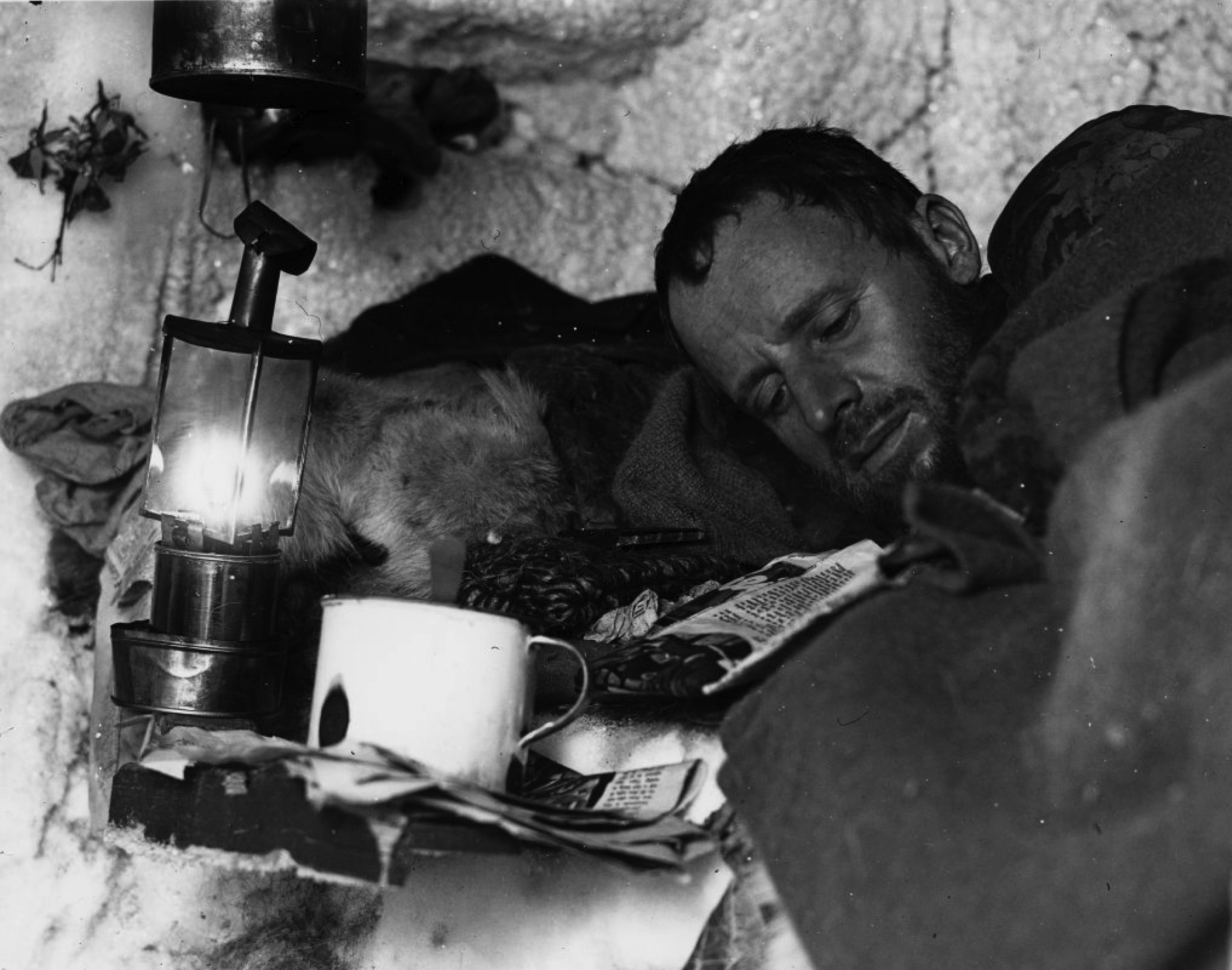
- Born: 11 March 1895
- Died: 27 March 1974 (aged 79)
- Education: doctorate
- Occupation: Meteorologist; scientist

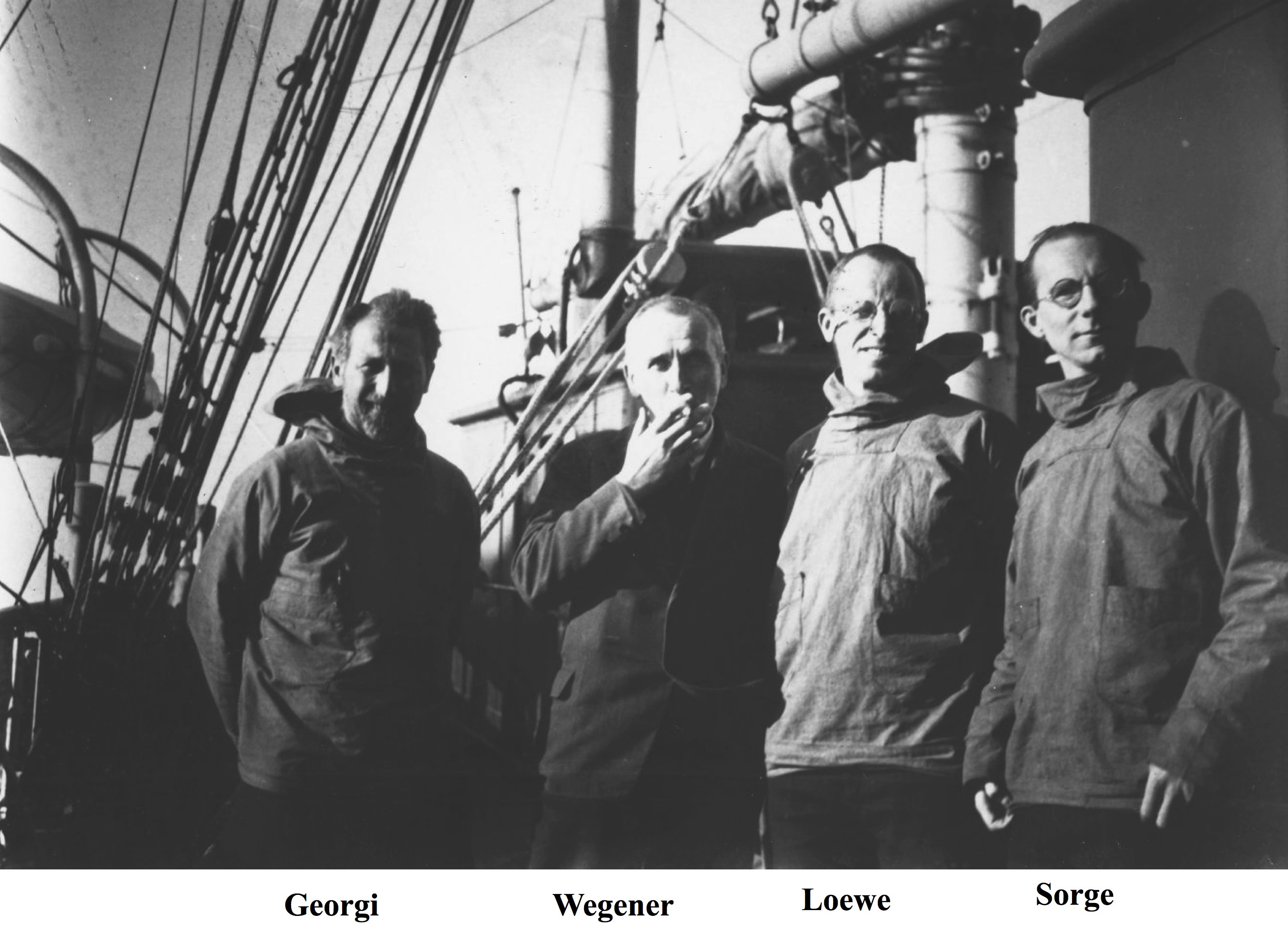
The main scientists of the German Greenland Expedition.

Fritz Loewe (11 March 1895 in Schöneberg - 27 March 1974 in Heidelberg, Victoria) was a German polar explorer, glaciologist, geophysicist and meteorologist.

After emigrating from Nazi Germany he founded the first Meteorological Institute in Australia at the University of Melbourne.

== Biography ==
Fritz was the son of judge Eugen Loewe (1855–1925) and Hedwig Loewe, nee Makower, (1869–1956). From 1908 to 1913 he was a student at the Joachimsthal Gymnasium in Berlin. In World War I he served as artillery radio operator both in the Eastern and Western fronts and was awarded the Iron Cross, 1st class. After the war he joined the Reich League of Jewish Front-Line Soldiers, established in 1919. Initially Fritz had wanted to become a lawyer, but he left his studies and devoted himself to study physics, geography and meteorology in Berlin. In 1925 he replaced Kurt Wegener as head of the scientific flight department of the Prussian Aeronautical Observatory Lindenberg. He had wanted to be a pilot, but his eyesight was not up to the mark, so he had to take measurements and readings while sitting on the rear cockpit of the plane. In 1927 he married Else Koestler (1902–?), a geography student from the Sauerland region.

Fritz Loewe took part in the preparatory trip of the German Greenland Expedition led by Alfred Wegener in 1929. Working together with Ernst Sorge he became familiar with the newly-developed seismic procedure of measuring ice thickness.

In 1930-1931 he went back to Greenland to join the main expedition as a glaciologist. While in Greenland Loewe made groundbreaking research on the accumulation and ablation of snow. Following a harsh journey with Wegener to the central Eismitte station in severe weather and ice conditions his toes froze and had to be amputated. While overwintering at the station on the Greenland ice-sheet he made observations with scientists Johannes Georgi and Ernst Sorge, gathering a wealth of glaciological and meteorological data. On 7 May one of the aerosledges of the expedition reached the Central Station and brought Loewe to the Western Station in only two days. During the following weeks Loewe assisted Kurt Wegener in logistical matters while he took over command of the venture following his brother Alfred Wegener's untimely death. The expedition came to an end on 1 August 1931.

In 1932 Loewe and his colleague Ernst Sorge travelled again to Greenland to serve as technical consultants to Universal Pictures for the movie S.O.S. Eisberg directed by Arnold Fanck.

In February 1934 Loewe lost his position at the Aeronautical Observatory after he was denounced as a Jew by Ernst Sorge. He spent the month of August in detention. Following this experience, Loewe decided to leave the Third Reich. He moved to England with his wife Else and his two baby daughters, Ruth (1933–2002) and Susanne (born 1934).

The Scott Polar Research Institute provided Loewe a stipend for a year, which was renewed after the period ran out. He also had the chance to give lectures on climatology at Cambridge University. During this time he also processed the data collected during the Wegener Expedition and began to prepare studies on Antarctica. Finally, in 1937 Loewe left England with his family and emigrated to Australia, a move that had been proposed to him by Sir Raymond Priestley, one of the founders of the Scott Polar Research Institute and Vice-chancellor of the University of Melbourne. Loewe was offered the opportunity to work as a teacher at the university and in 1939 he founded a meteorological institute at the university, which was the first of its kind in Australia. He led the institute for over twenty years and researched coastal fog, dust storms and "free atmosphere" conditions.

From 1947 onwards Loewe revived again his interest in Antarctica. He took part in the unsuccessful 1947–48 Australian National Antarctic Research Expeditions (ANARE) reconnaissance endeavor on HMAS Wyatt Earp. The goal was to find out an adequate place for the establishment of a permanent Australian polar station on the Antarctic continent. However, in December 1947 the ship suffered damage caused by severe storms and had to sail back to Melbourne for repairs. In February 1948 it left again towards the Antarctic coast, but awful weather and pack ice conditions made it impossible for the ship to approach the shore. Finally the effort was given up and the ship sailed back to Macquarie Island and then to Melbourne.

In 1950 Loewe became the Australian observer with the French Antarctic Expedition (Expéditions Polaires Françaises), which built the, now abandoned, Port Martin station on the coast of Adélie Land in 1951–52. Thus he became the first German polar explorer who had wintered both in the Arctic and in the Antarctic. In the course of this expedition he took numerous scientific measurements and gathered the data for his work on the meteorological conditions in Antarctica.

In 1958 Loewe was asked by UNESCO to establish a meteorological training institute in Karachi. During his stay in Pakistan he went to the Himalayas to study the glaciers of the Nanga Parbat. Officially Loewe retired in 1960, but he stayed academically active at the Meteorological Institute of the University of Melbourne. Between 1961 and 1973 he also became a visiting Professor at the Byrd Polar Research Center of the Ohio State University and travelled often to Columbus, Ohio, together with his wife Else. In 1967 Loewe visited Greenland for the last time. On 27 March 1974 he had a heart attack on his way home from the institute and died shortly thereafter at the hospital. He was survived by his wife and two daughters.

== Posthumous honors ==
Mount Loewe and the Loewe Massif in the Aramis Range, as well as the Fritz Loewe Plateau in Adélie Land, and Loewe Island off the eastern shore of Adelaide Island in Antarctica, were named in his honor.

== See also ==
- German Greenland Expedition
