= Wegener (Martian crater) =

Wegener Crater
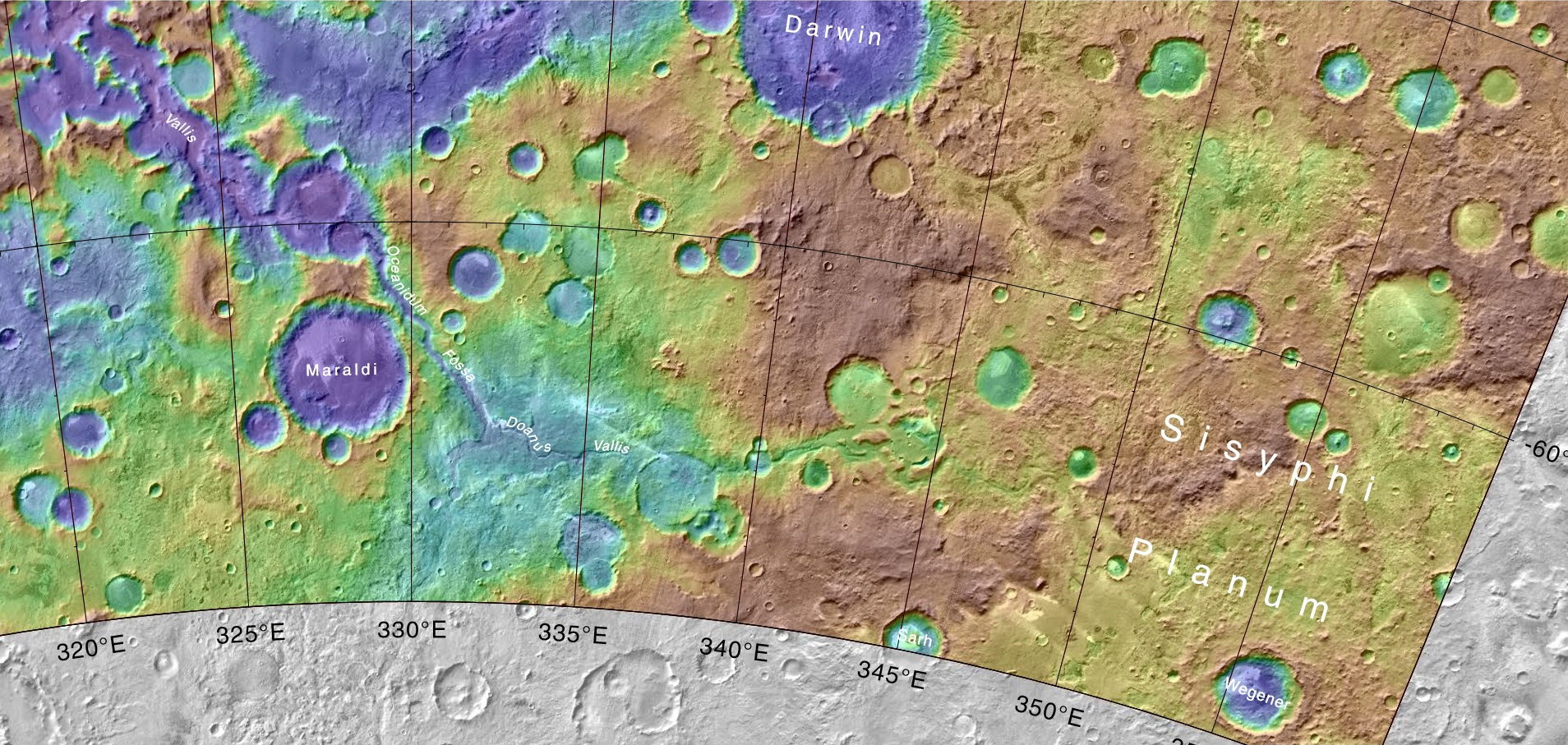
- Topo map showing the location of Wegener Crater
- Planet: Mars
- Region: Argyre quadrangle
- Coordinates: 64.6°S 4°W
- Quadrangle: Argyre
- Diameter: 68.51 km (42.57 mi)
- Eponym: Alfred Wegener

Wegener is an impact crater in the Argyre quadrangle of Mars, located at 64.6°S latitude and 4.0°W longitude. It measures approximately 68.51 kilometres (42.57 mi) in diameter and was named after German geophysicist Alfred Wegener (1880–1930). The name was approved by IAU's Working Group for Planetary System Nomenclature in 1973.

== Description ==
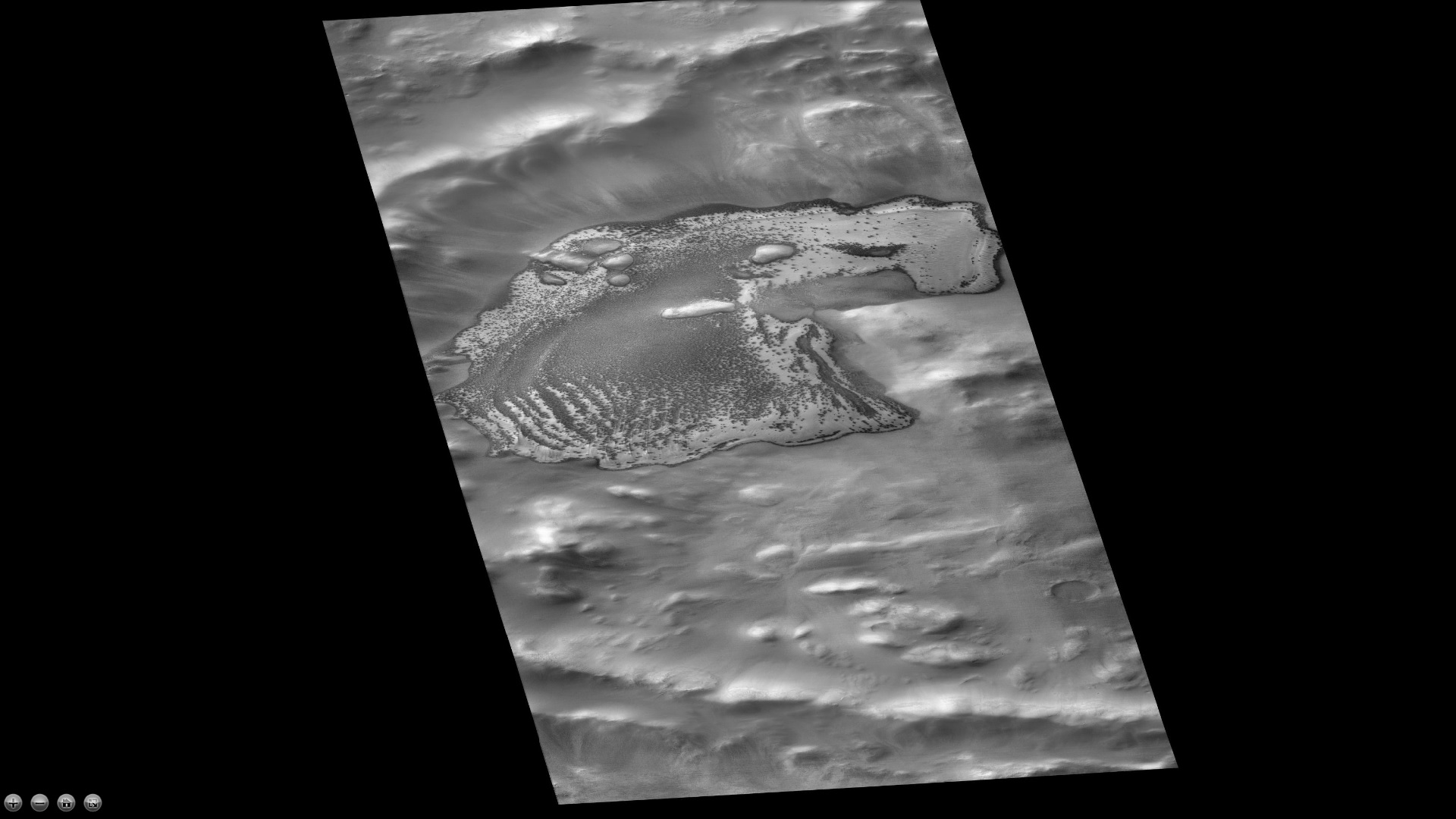
Wegener Crater, as seen by CTX camera (on Mars Reconnaissance Orbiter)

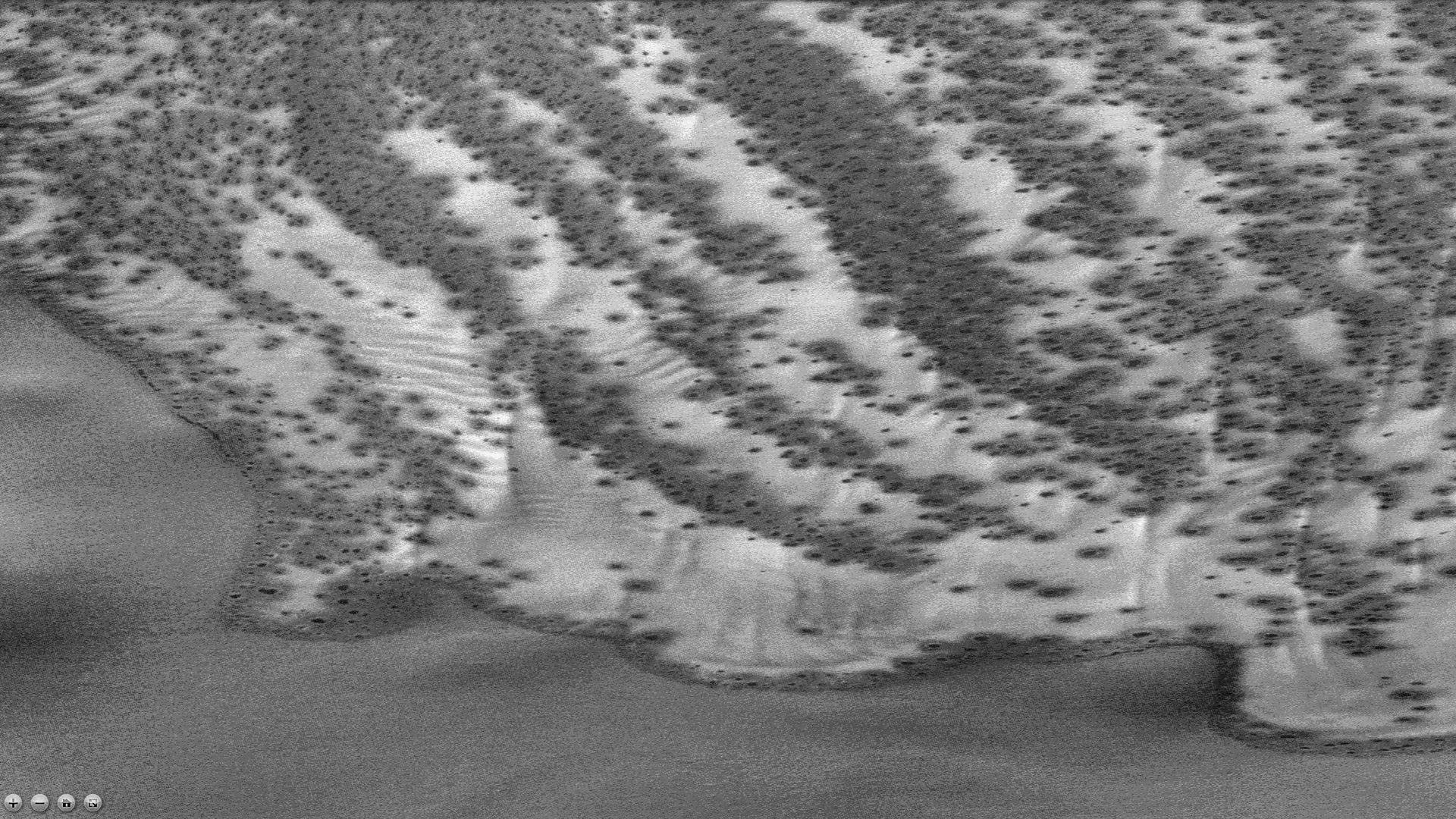
Wegener Crater showing dunes defrosting, as seen by CTX camera (on Mars Reconnaissance Orbiter). Dark spots are places where frost has disappeared from the dark dunes. Note: this is an enlargement of the previous image of Wegener Crater.

Dark spots appear on dunes in the higher latitudes of Mars. In these spots mineral grains may be covered with a thin film of water that may affect chemical weathering of minerals and may help possible Martian organisms to survive. Studies have shown that thin films of water could exist at times on the Martian surface at certain times and in certain locations. In places, thin layers of liquid water could be present for 38 sols (Martian days) in the warmer periods of the day. Dark spots appear on dunes in the higher latitudes of Mars.

Sometimes geysers form near the spots. They have two main features (dark dune spots and spider channels) that appear at the beginning of the Martian spring on dune fields covered with carbon dioxide (CO_{2} or 'dry ice'), mainly at the ridges and slopes of the dunes; by the beginning of winter, they disappear. Dark spots' shape is generally round, on the slopes it is usually elongated.

With the stronger sunshine of spring in certain regions, carbon dioxide gas jets shoot dark dust in the air. This dark dust will increase the absorption of light and cause the temperature to rise to where water can exist for short periods.

== See also ==
- List of craters on Mars
