= German Greenland Expedition =

1930–1931 Wegener expedition

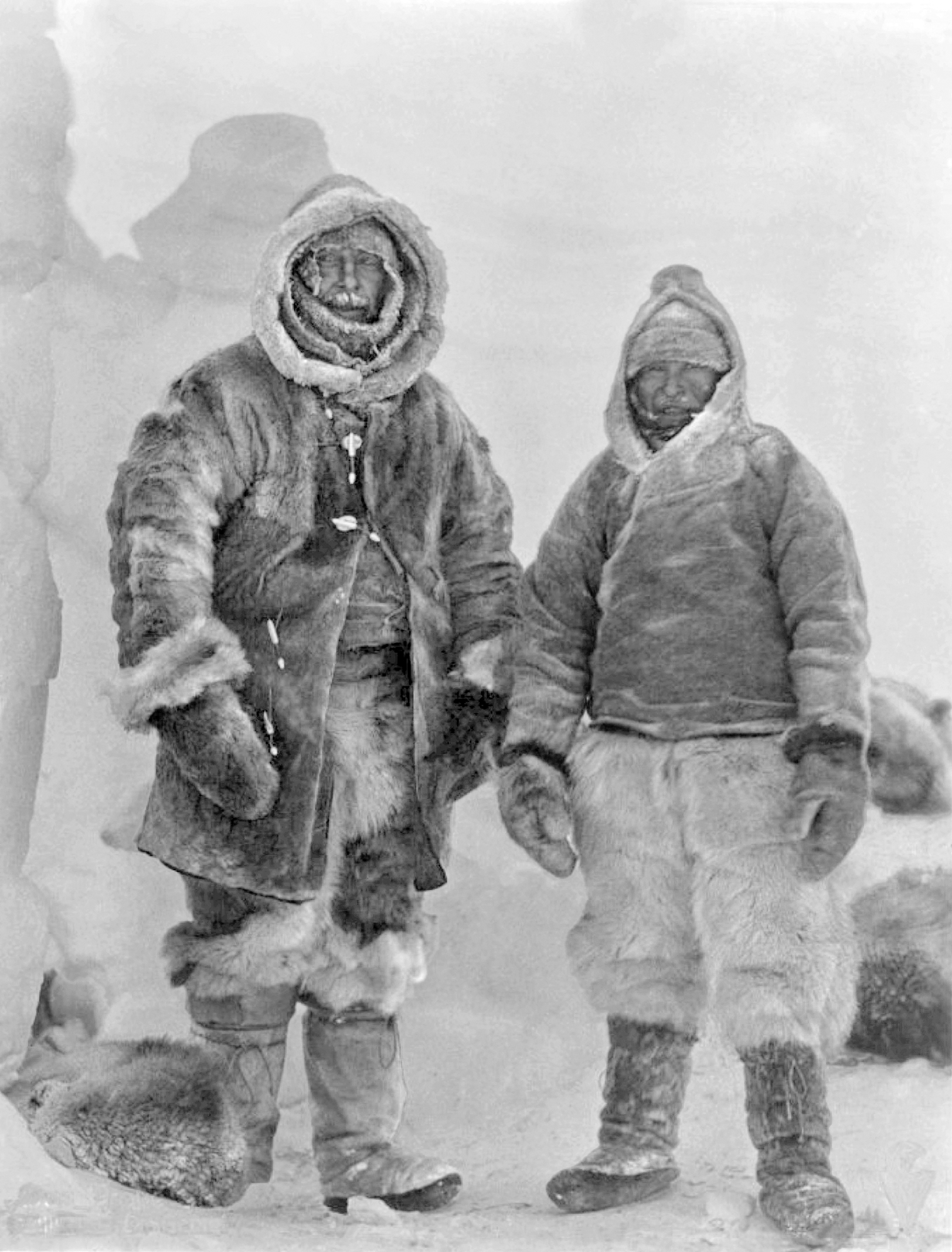
Alfred Wegener (left) and Rasmus Villumsen shortly before their ill-fated journey to the Western Station.

The German Greenland Expedition (German: Deutsche Grönlandexpedition), also known as the Wegener Expedition, was an expedition to Greenland in 1930–1931. It was led by German scientist Alfred Wegener (1880–1930), who had previously taken part in two other ventures to Greenland. His purpose was to make a systematic study of the Greenland ice sheet.

In 1929, as a preliminary expedition (German: Vorexpedition), Wegener went to Greenland to explore a suitable place to reach the Greenland Ice Sheet. The main expedition would begin the following year with the goal to establish three Arctic stations on the same parallel. The central station was named Eismitte and was located at 71°11′N 39°56′W near the center of the ice sheet. In the end this venture would claim Wegener's life during a return trip from the Eismitte station together with expedition member Rasmus Villumsen.

Wegener had experience as an Arctic explorer. Previously he had taken part as a meteorologist in the 1906–1908 Danmark Expedition and the 1912-1913 Danish Expedition to Queen Louise Land.

== Preparatory expedition 1929 ==
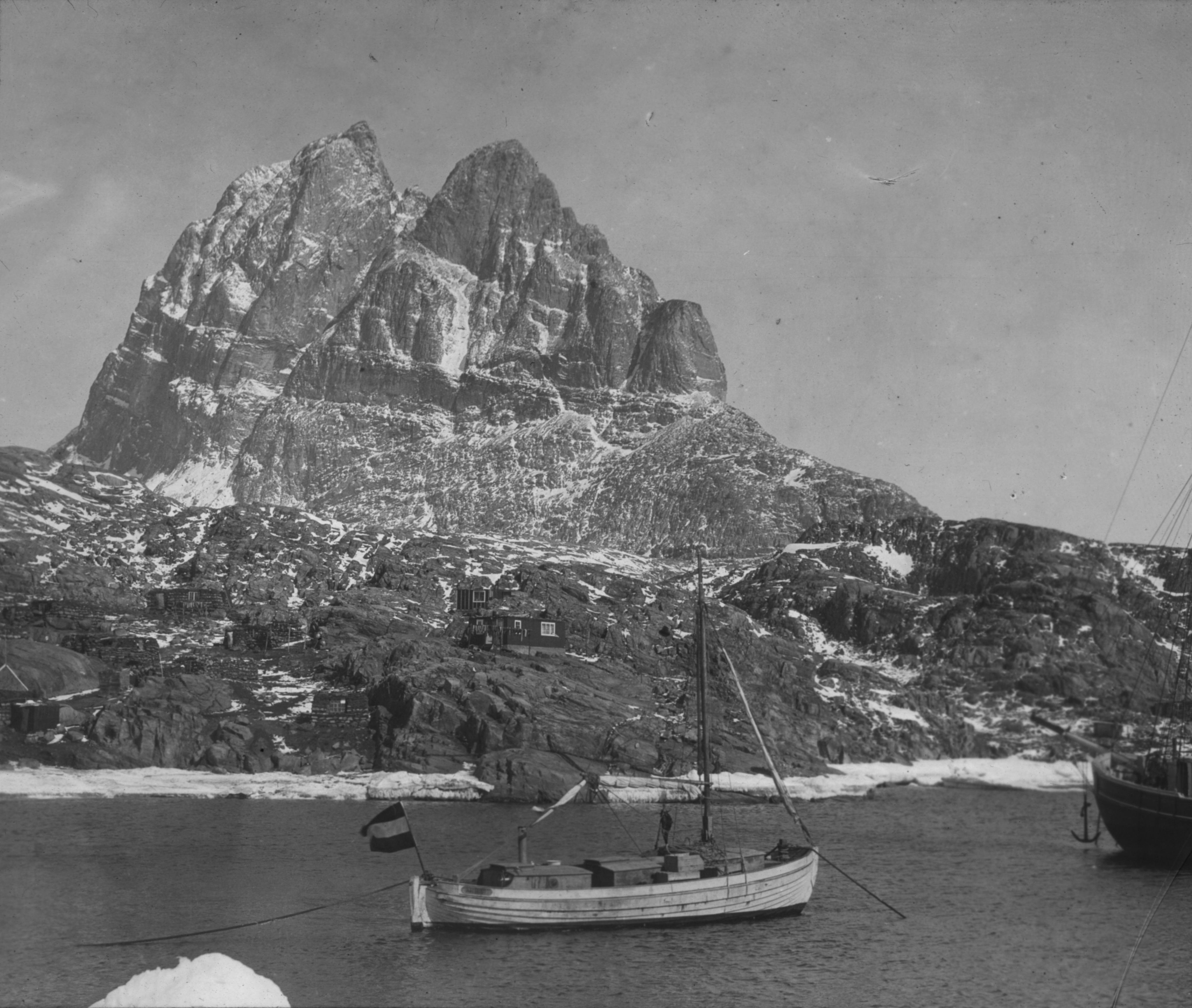
Boat Krabbe of the minor expedition near Uummannaq Mountain.

The first phase was an exploratory trip in 1929 to prepare the ground for the actual expedition which would take place the following year. Finances came from the Notgemeinschaft der Deutschen Wissenschaft. Wegener was accompanied by Johannes Georgi, Fritz Loewe and Ernst Sorge. They sailed on the ship Gertrud Rask to the western shore of Greenland. After arrival Wegener recruited, among others, Greenlandic Inuit Tobias Gabrielsen, with whom he was acquainted from the Danmark Expedition. The goal of this minor expedition was to find a suitable location to reach the Greenland ice sheet. It should be far enough to the south for the landing to be feasible as early as possible in the spring season, but also not too far from the northern latitudes, so that the temperature of the glaciers would be low enough. The preliminary expedition also sought a good place to build the Western base station, as well as to assess the equipment and materiel that would be needed for the expedition; especially the means of transport. Wegener decided to bring dogsledges and ponies as well as aerosledges. He also used the occasion to carry out preliminary scientific research, including ice-drilling in order to gain knowledge about the melting and accumulation of the ice, as well as a seismic method to measure the thickness of the Greenland ice sheet.

During the search for a satisfactory route to reach the ice sheet, the expedition members made a number of journeys on dogsledges, totaling 850 km (530 mi), including a 209 km (130 mi) eastward trip by Wegener and Georgi reaching a height of 2,500 m (8,200 ft).

== Main expedition 1930-1931 ==
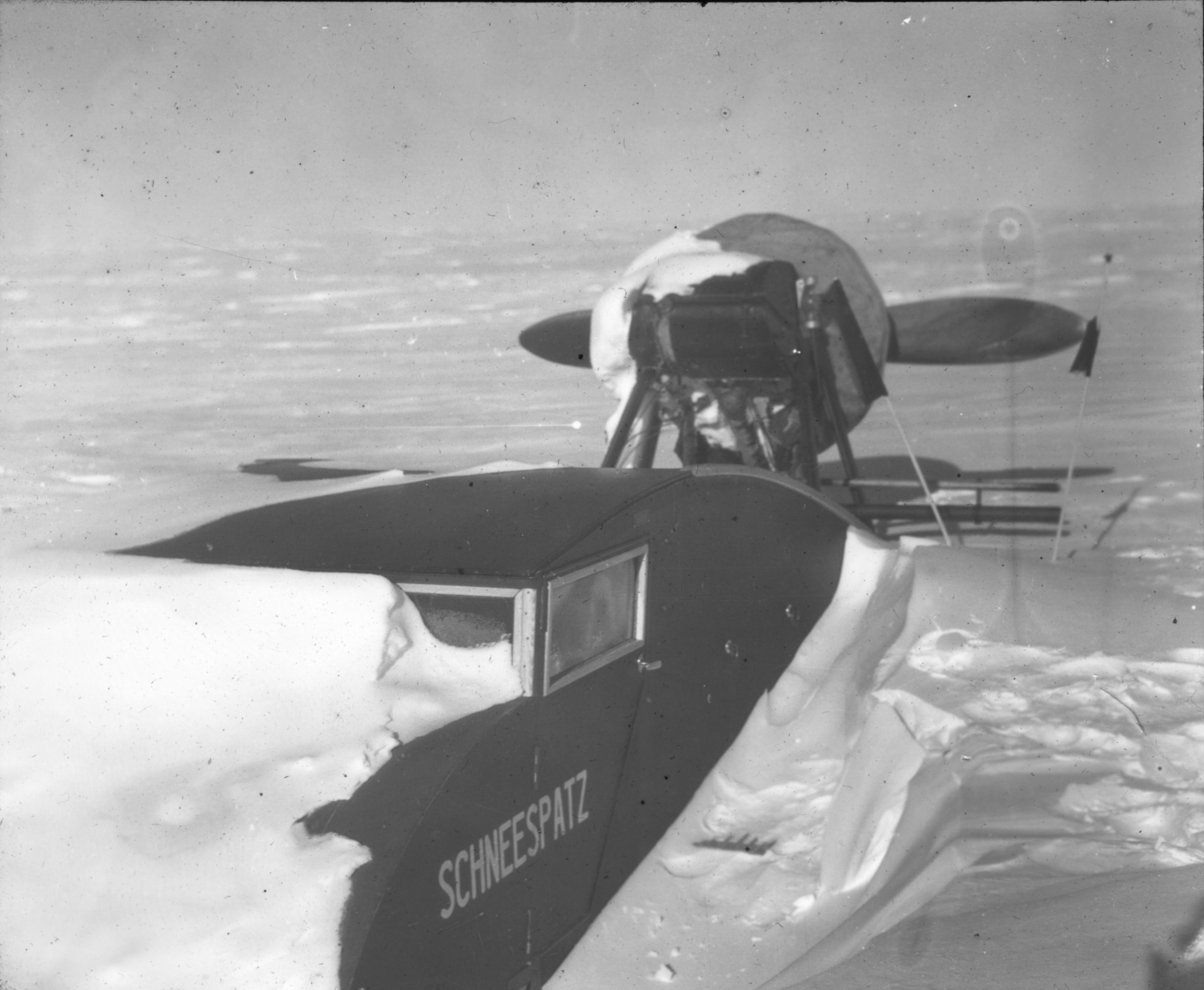
One of the aerosledges of the expedition bogged in snow.

The following year on 1 April the expedition left Copenhagen on ship Disko. Led by Wegener, the expedition ran into difficulties from the onset. The goal was to establish three Arctic stations on the same parallel —one on the east coast, one in the middle, and one on the west coast— working together in order to take meteorological and atmospheric records and observations for a year between 1 August 1930 and 1 August 1931.

However, precious time was lost owing to adverse ice conditions on the western shore of Greenland. The wasted 38 days could not be caught up.

=== The Western Station ===
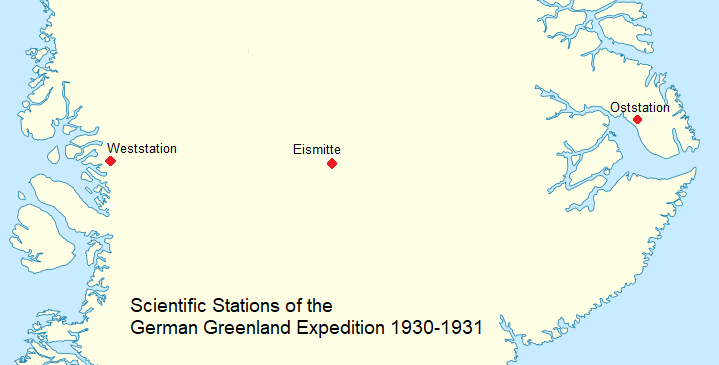
The three German Greenland Expedition stations 1930-1931

Qaamarujuk Fjord, at 71°08′N 51°14′W was chosen as the place where the ship would anchor. It arrived near Uummannaq on 4 May 1930 and sailed to Uvkusigsat Fjord, close to the projected landing site. However, because of unfavorable ice conditions the sledges could not be used to transport the materiel at Qaamarujuk. Only on 16 June the coastal camp was set up and the work of transporting the equipment up to the ice sheet began. Since the Qaamarujuk Glacier was rapidly melting because of the advanced season, a way was found up the lateral moraine. In this manner roughly 125 t (123 long tons; 138 short tons) of materiel, including equipment, provisions and two propeller-driven aerosledges, were transported to a height of over 1,000 m (3,300 ft) on the ice sheet by Icelandic ponies and Greenlandic Inuit carriers. The transport of so much equipment to establish the Western Station (German: Weststation) at the edge of the upper Qaamarujuk Glacier took 120 days. Finally the wintering station building was erected and the scientific observations and measurements began. The aerosledges, on which Wegener had initially laid great store, were a disappointment owing to the poor performance of their engines and because they tended to become bogged in deep snow.

=== The Central station ===
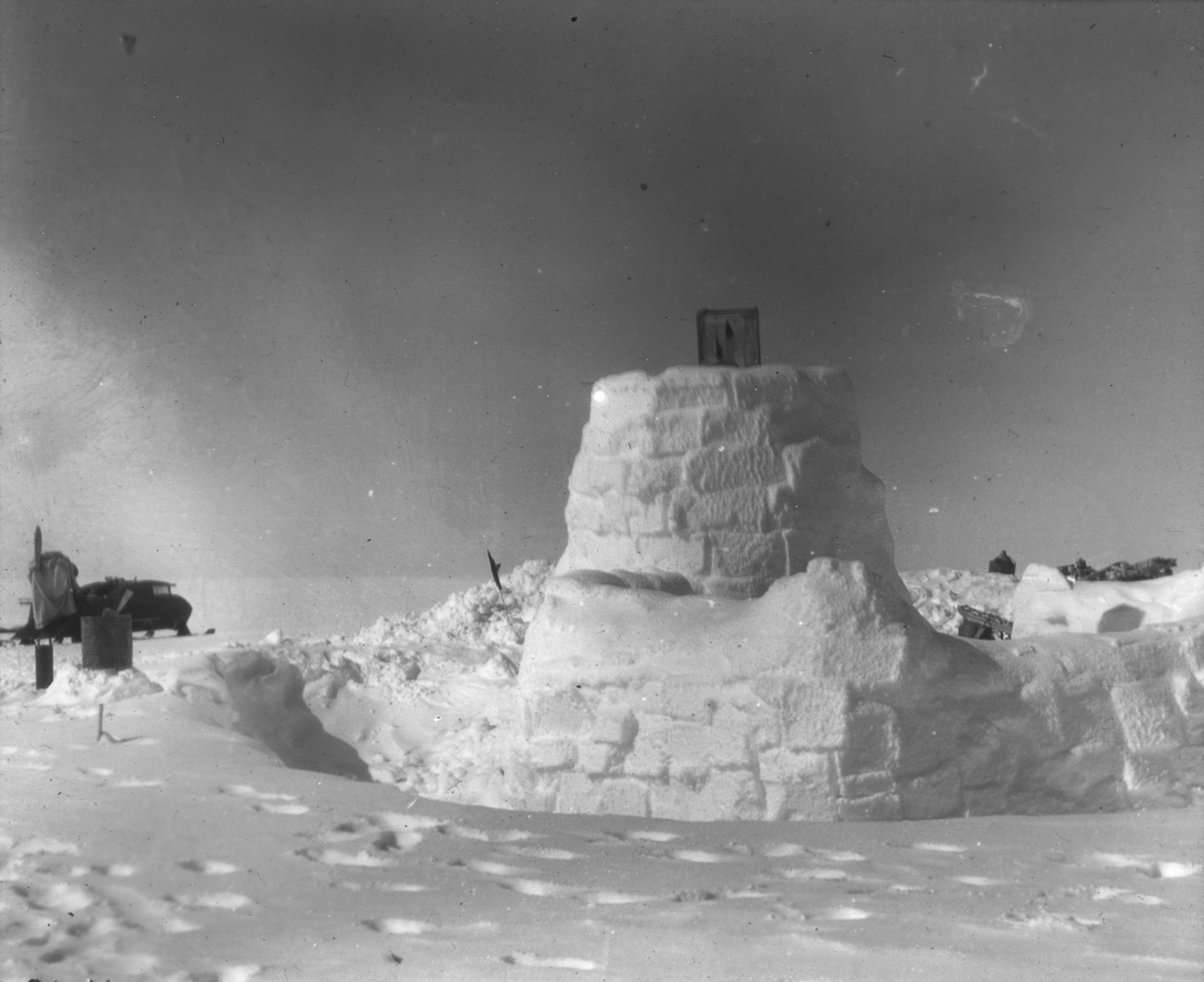
View of the central station of the expedition.

Dogsledges were used by Georgi and a party of Greenlandic helpers to carry the materiel further inland. They went to set up the Ice-Centre (German: Eismitte) station 400 km (250 mi) to the east in a central position on the Greenland Ice Sheet. Sorge later joined Georgi in order to spend the winter at the central camp. Both would be wintering at Eismitte camp, gathering meteorological data and measuring the thickness of the ice sheet by means of seismic readings after detonating explosives. Since the tents on the surface were too cold, they burrowed underground dwellings in the ice where the cold was not that intense. Sorge had sent a note to Wegener telling that unless he and Georgi got supplies by 20 October, they would not survive the winter. On 21 September Wegener finally left the Western Station accompanied by Loewe and 13 Greenlandic Inuit with fifteen sleds loaded with supplies pulled by 130 dogs. While on his way he received the note sent by Georgi and Sorge. The eastward journey across the ice sheet took 40 days and conditions were so harsh that most of the Inuit turned back. Finally only Wegener, Loewe and dogsledge driver Rasmus Villumsen reached Eismitte at the end of October. After celebrating his birthday, Wegener decided to return to the Western Station together with Villumsen. They left on 1 November, but they never made it to the base. Wegener's body was found on the ice sheet by a search party in April of the following year, but no trace was found of Villumsen. Wegener's journals were also lost.

=== The Eastern Station ===
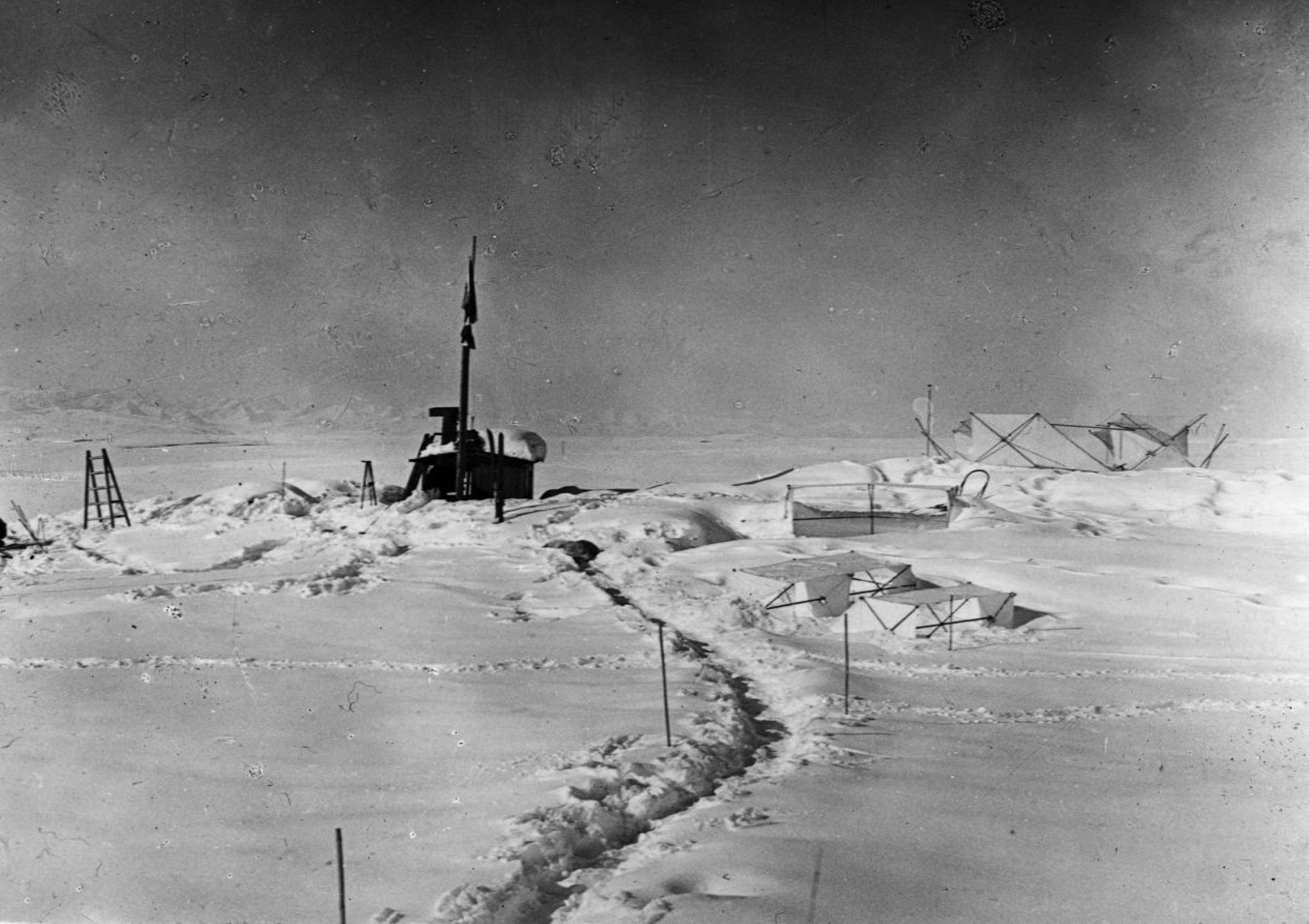
View of the Eastern Station in the spring 1931.

The Eastern scientific station (German: Oststation) doing meteorological and atmospheric groundwork as part of the German Greenland Expedition was located by the Scoresby Sound, a large fjord area in East Greenland. Research began in July 1930, carried out by a team of three led by Walther Kapp that had arrived on Ship Gertrud Rask of the Royal Greenland Trading Department. First they made observations in the vicinity of Scoresbysund village, now Ittoqqortoormiit. Later, in early September the scientists moved north to the west coast of Jameson Land at 71°03′N 24°15′W, assisted by Scoresbysund Greenlandic Inuit. They built a wooden house where they established their Oststation wintering base, which their Greenlandic helpers named Tyskit Nunaat. From there the Germans carried out further surveys during the winter. By May 1931 the scientists wrapped up their studies and headed back to Scoresbysund. After over a month in the village they were picked up by steamer Gertrud Rask in July and sailed back to Germany.

Located near Gurreholm, the Danish scientific station built by Lauge Koch further north in 1937, no traces are left of the German expedition's Eastern station. Hence, it was possibly dismantled by the expedition members before they left and the materials were gifted to their Greenlandic helpers.

== Aftermath ==
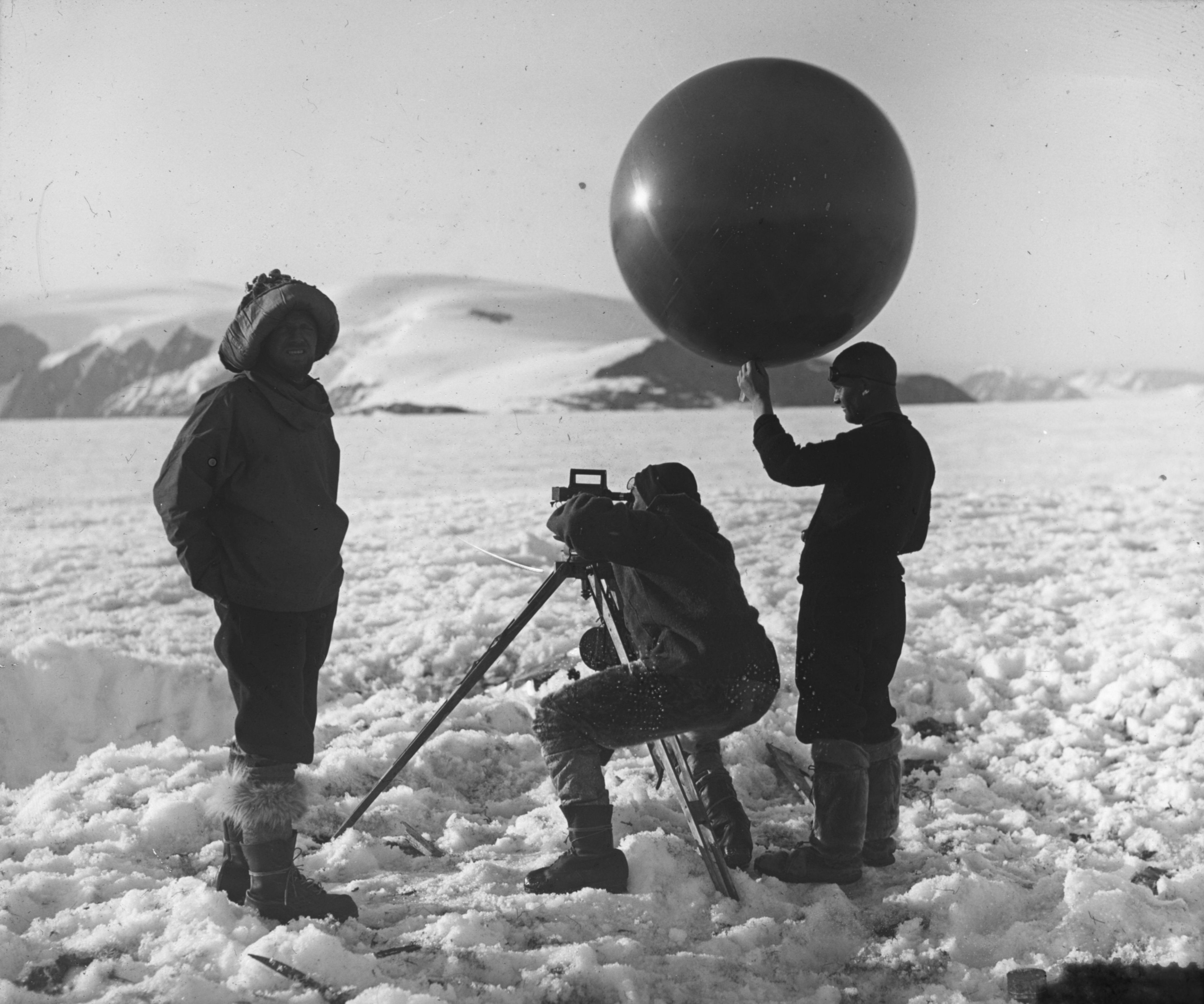
Photographs of the German expedition and overwintering in Greenland in 1930/31

Kurt Wegener, Alfred Wegener's brother, took command of the expedition in order to avoid an abrupt end. Thus the experiments and observations continued during the first half of 1931 until 1 August, which was the original plan. During that period of time a wealth of atmospheric and meteorological data were collected by the three stations throwing light on the climate conditions of Greenland. Also the numerous glaciological observations helped to understand the dynamics of ice sheets for the first time ever, making it possible to measure the structure of the Greenland ice sheet for the first time in scientific history.

Wegener had put into practice the seismological methods developed by geophysicist Emil Wiechert of the University of Göttingen physics institute. His aim was to find out the thickness of the Greenland ice sheet, as well as the geological structure of the terrain underneath the thick ice. Small explosions were caused on the ice and the sound waves travelling through it were registered. Seismic readings of tests conducted at station Ice-Centre showed that the bedrock at the bottom of the ice sheet was 2,500 m (8,200 ft) to 2,700 m (8,900 ft) below the surface, indicating that central Greenland was lower than its coastal periphery.

Else Köppen, Wegener's widow, requested that the body of her husband be left where it was found. A 6 m (20 ft) high iron cross was planted in the ice sheet above the spot where his remains lie.

== Literature ==
- Murphy, D. T. (2002). German Exploration of the Polar World: A History, 1870–1940.
- Else Wegener & Fritz Loewe eds. Greenland journey, the story of Wegener's German expedition to Greenland in 1930-31 as told by members of the expedition and the leader's diary, translated by Winifred M. Deans. Blackie & Son Limited, London and Glasgow, 1939

== See also ==
- Cartographic expeditions to Greenland
- List of research stations in the Arctic
