= Treysa (meteorite) =

Meteorite

Coordinates: 50.944317°N 9.159733°E

Treysa Meteorite
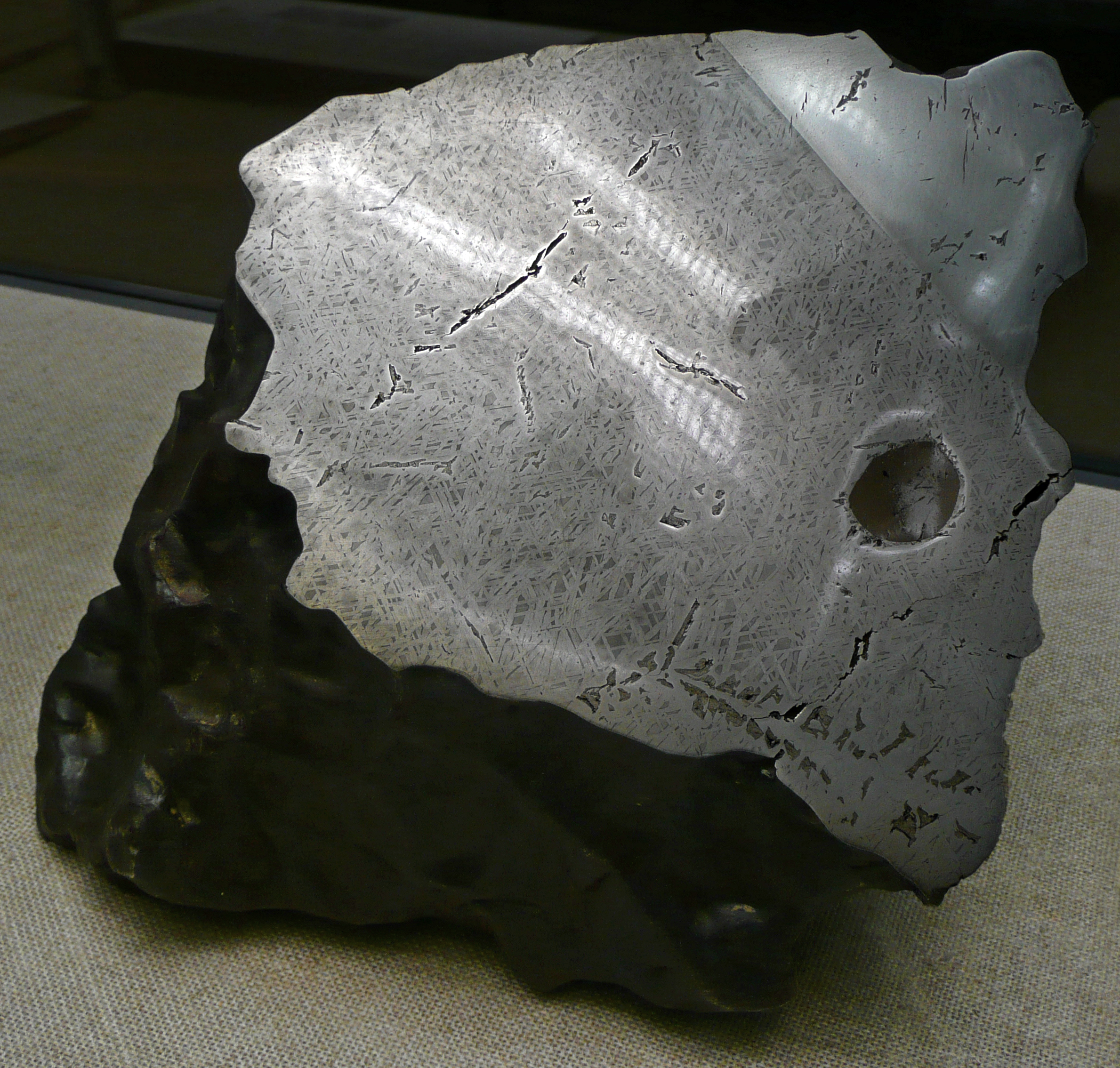
- Cut surface with Widmanstätten patterns
- Type: Iron meteorite
- Structural classification: medium octahedrite
- Class: Magmatic
- Group: IIIB
- Country: Germany
- Region: Schwalmstadt, northern Hesse
- Observed fall: Yes
- Fall date: 1916-04-03
- Found date: 1917-03-05
- TKW: 63.28 kilograms (139.5 lb)
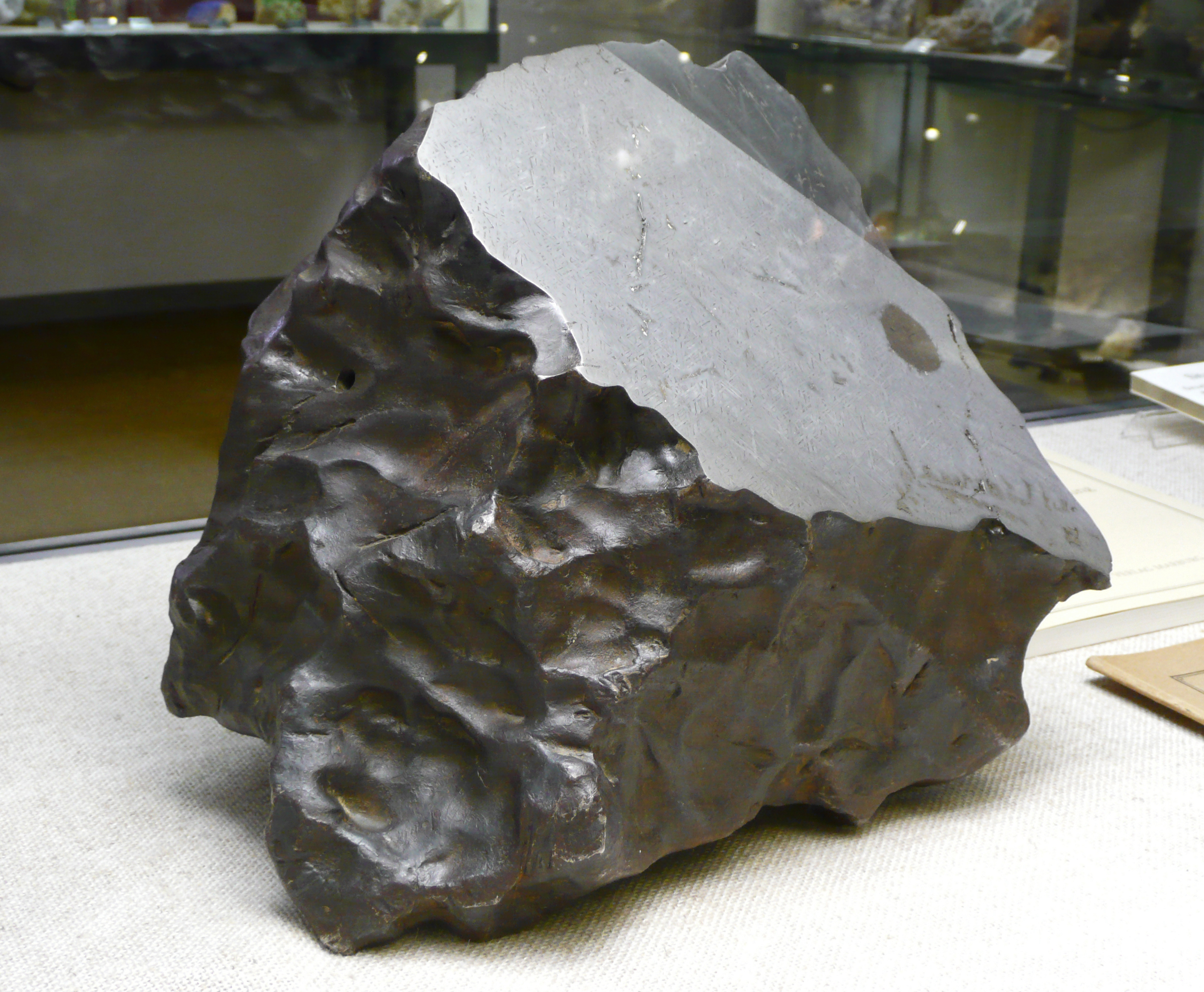
- Treysa Meteorite (main section)
- Related media on Wikimedia Commons

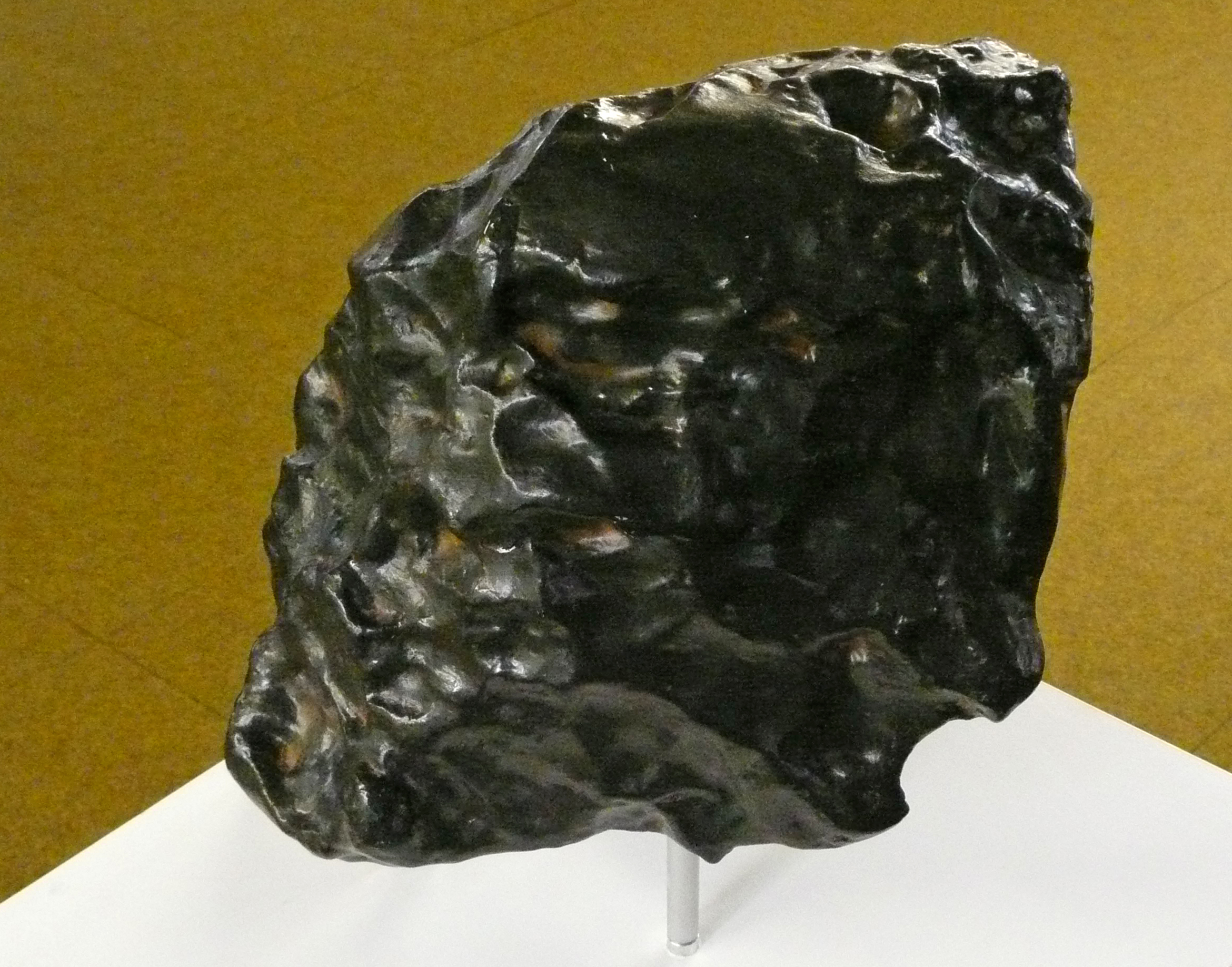
Cast of the entire meteorite

The Treysa Meteorite, also known as the Rommershausen Meteorite (both Treysa and Rommershausen are districts of Schwalmstadt), is an astronomical relic found in a wooded area near the Rommershausen district of Schwalmstadt in northern Hesse, Germany. The meteorite made German astronomical history as one of the most significant confirmed meteorite collisions of recent history. It is classified as a medium octahedrite of the IIIB chemical class and shows Widmanstätten patterns.

== History of recovery ==
On 3 April 1916 at 15:30, eyewitnesses reported a detonation like a clap of thunder and a cloud of smoke. This light-and-sound phenomenon was caused by a meteorite crashing onto the earth in a wooded area near Rommershausen.

Based on the eyewitness accounts, Alfred Wegener calculated the trajectory of the meteorite and its likely impact site. In recognition of its scientific relevance, 300 Reichsmark were offered as a reward to the finder, and it was indeed eventually discovered near the calculated site. The forester Hupmann managed to locate it on 5 March 1917 in a wooded area near Rommershausen; a one-and-one-half-meter-deep impact crater contained the 63.28-kilogram (139.5 lb), 36-centimetre-wide (14 in) iron meteorite. It had been only slightly shattered by the impact and was almost completely preserved. The 23 slices and thin-ground sections cut from the meteorite have been studied by various geological and mineralogical research institutes.

Since 1986 a memorial stone placed at the site of impact by the Knüllgebirgsverein, a hiking and nature club named after the Knüllgebirge mountain range in Hesse, commemorates this cosmic event.

The meteorite is on display at the Mineralogischen Museum Marburg (Lahn), and there is a copy at the Museum der Schwalm in Ziegenhain. Directions to the meteorite impact location are posted on a path (Ringstrasse) in the Rommershausen forest.

== See also ==
- Glossary of meteoritics

== Literature ==
- 750 Jahre Rommershausen, Dorfchronik.
- Alfred Wegener: Das detonierende Meteor vom 3. April 1916, 3 1/2 Uhr nachmittags in Kurhessen. 1917. Nachdruck: Elwert, Marburg 2001, ISBN 3-7708-1160-7
