= Kollerfjorden =

Bay in Svalbard, Norway

Coordinates: 79.29°N 12.05°E

Kollerfjorden is a bay in Haakon VII Land at Spitsbergen, Svalbard. It is located in the inner part of Krossfjorden, at the eastern side. The bay is named after Norwegian topographer Alfred Koller. At the eastern side of Kollerfjorden is the point of Speidarneset, and to the south the bay ends at Regnardneset. There are anchoring conditions for vessels both at the north side and the south side of the bay.
