= Eismitte =

Meteorological station in Greenland

Coordinates: 71°10′N 39°56′W

Location within Greenland

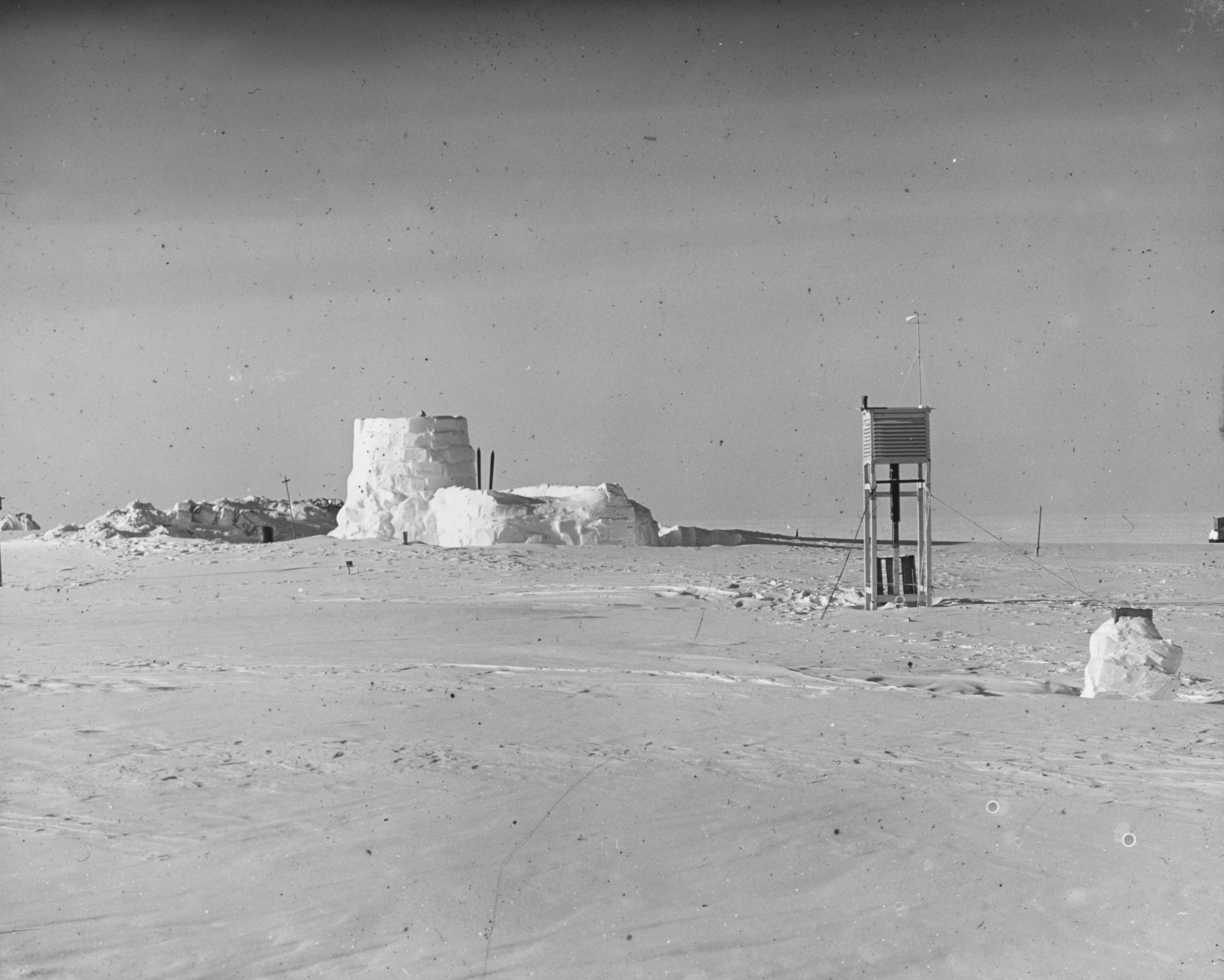
Station Eismitte in 1930

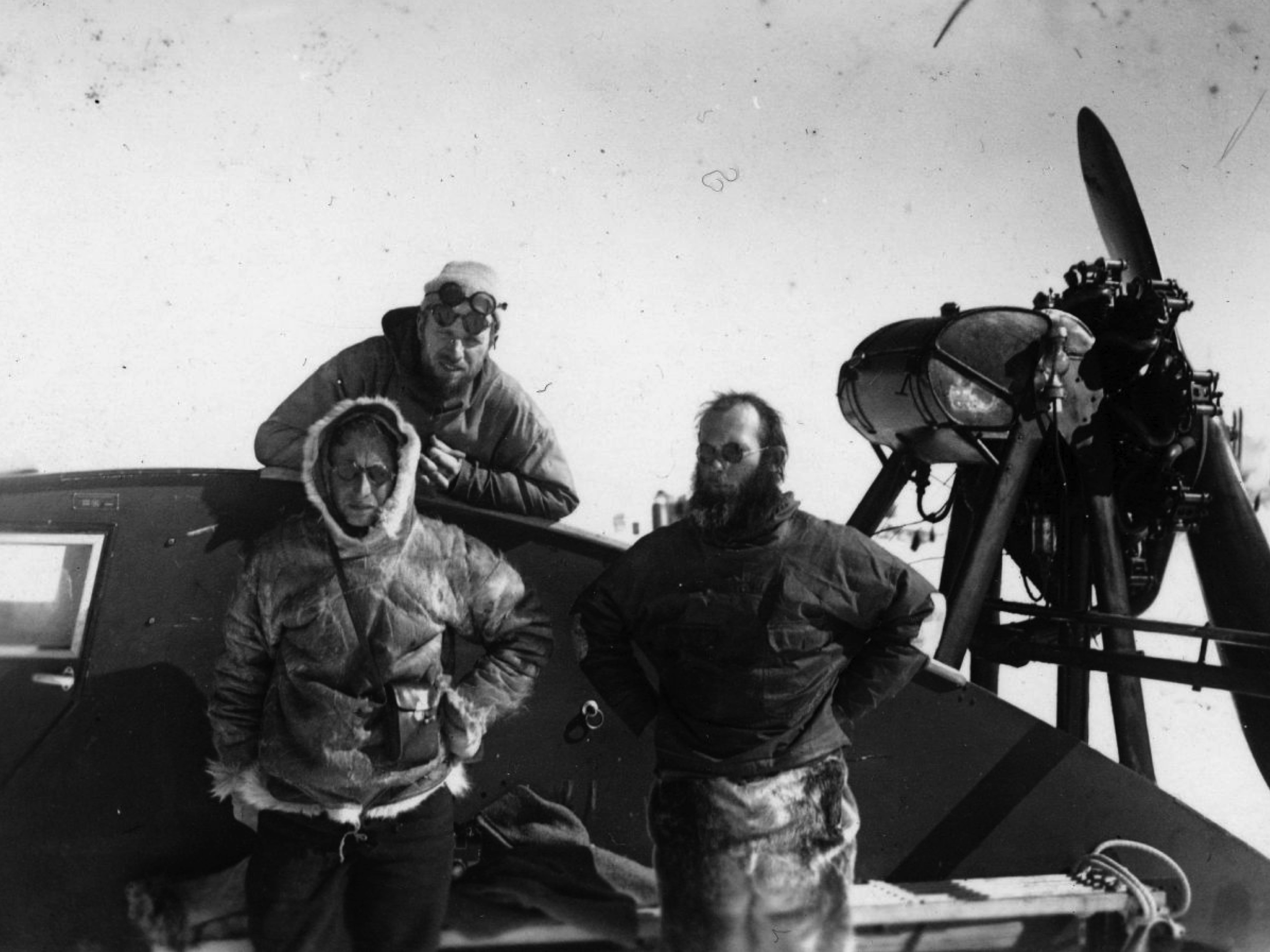
The three scientists manning the station: Ernst Sorge, Fritz Loewe and Johannes Georgi with one of the aerosledges of the expedition.

Eismitte, also called Mid-Ice in English, was a meteorological station established, in the middle of the Greenland Ice Sheet, by the 1930-31 German Greenland Expedition. The venture took place from July 1930 until August 1931, and established three Arctic stations on the same parallel. The expedition leader, German scientist Alfred Wegener, died during a trip back from Eismitte, in early November 1930. The station was abandoned on 1 August 1931.

== Location ==
The name "Eismitte" means Ice-Middle in German, and the campsite was located 402 kilometers (250 mi) from the coast at an estimated altitude of 3,010 metres (9,880 ft). The coldest temperature recorded at the site was −64.8 °C (−84.6 °F) on 20 March 1931, while the warmest temperature noted was −1.8 °C (28.8 °F) on 9 July 1931. For the 12-month period beginning 1 August 1930 and ending 5 August 1931, the warmest month, July, had a mean monthly temperature of −12.3 °C (9.9 °F). while the coldest month, February, averaged −47.2 °C (−53.0 °F). Over the same period a total of 110 millimetres (4.3 in) of water-equivalent precipitation was recorded, with most of it being received in Winter. At the latitude of the camp, the sun does not set between 13 May and 30 July each year, and does not rise between 23 November and 20 January.

== Wintering ==
Ernst Sorge was a member of Alfred Wegener's expedition. Together with Johannes Georgi he stayed in Eismitte from July 1930 to August 1931. Fritz Loewe stayed from October 1930 to May 1931. Sorge hand-dug a 15 m deep pit adjacent to his subterranean snow cave, which served as living quarters during the seven-month-long overwintering. Sorge systematically and quantitatively studied the near-surface snow/firn strata from inside his pit. After examination of the structural features and measurement of continuous density and other physical properties within the pit profile, he determined the characteristics of the individual limits of annual snow accumulation. This research validated the feasibility of measuring the preserved annual snow accumulation cycles, like measuring frozen precipitation in a rain gauge.

== Climate ==
Eismitte is one of the coldest locations in the Northern Hemisphere, with an annual mean temperature of −30.0 °C (−22 °F) having been recorded during the period of the expedition that established it. Eismitte has a polar ice cap climate. The weather station was run for approximately one year; the weather record thus is very sparse. The Summit Camp station slightly to the north has a similar climate with a much longer period of record.

Climate data for Eismitte Station (1 August 1930 to 6 August 1931)
Month	Jan	Feb	Mar	Apr	May	Jun	Jul	Aug	Sep	Oct	Nov	Dec	Year
Record high °C (°F)	−15 (5)	−22 (−8)	−15 (5)	−12 (10)	−8 (18)	−5 (23)	−2 (28)	−5 (23)	−8 (18)	−13 (9)	−18 (0)	−19 (−2)	−2 (28)
Mean daily maximum °C (°F)	−36 (−33)	−41 (−42)	−33 (−27)	−25 (−13)	−14 (7)	−10 (14)	−7 (19)	−11 (12)	−15 (5)	−30 (−22)	−36 (−33)	−33 (−27)	−24 (−12)
Daily mean °C (°F)	−41 (−42)	−47 (−53)	−39 (−38)	−31 (−24)	−20 (−4)	−16 (3)	−12 (10)	−18 (0)	−21 (−6)	−35 (−31)	−42 (−44)	−38 (−36)	−30 (−22)
Mean daily minimum °C (°F)	−47 (−53)	−53 (−63)	−46 (−51)	−38 (−36)	−27 (−17)	−22 (−8)	−17 (1)	−25 (−13)	−28 (−18)	−41 (−42)	−49 (−56)	−43 (−45)	−36 (−33)
Record low °C (°F)	−64 (−83)	−64 (−83)	−65 (−85)	−58 (−72)	−45 (−49)	−30 (−22)	−28 (−18)	−35 (−31)	−38 (−36)	−56 (−69)	−58 (−72)	−56 (−69)	−65 (−85)
Average precipitation mm (inches)	10 (0.4)	0 (0)	0 (0)	0 (0)	0 (0)	0 (0)	0 (0)	10 (0.4)	0 (0)	10 (0.4)	10 (0.4)	20 (0.8)	60 (2.4)
Average relative humidity (%)	80	77	79	82	84	81	86	84	84	81	79	78	81

== See also ==
- North Ice
- NEEM Camp
- Camp Century
- Cartographic expeditions to Greenland
- Pole of inaccessibility
