= Krossfjorden =

Fjord in Svalbard, Norway

Coordinates: 79°09′N 11°45′E

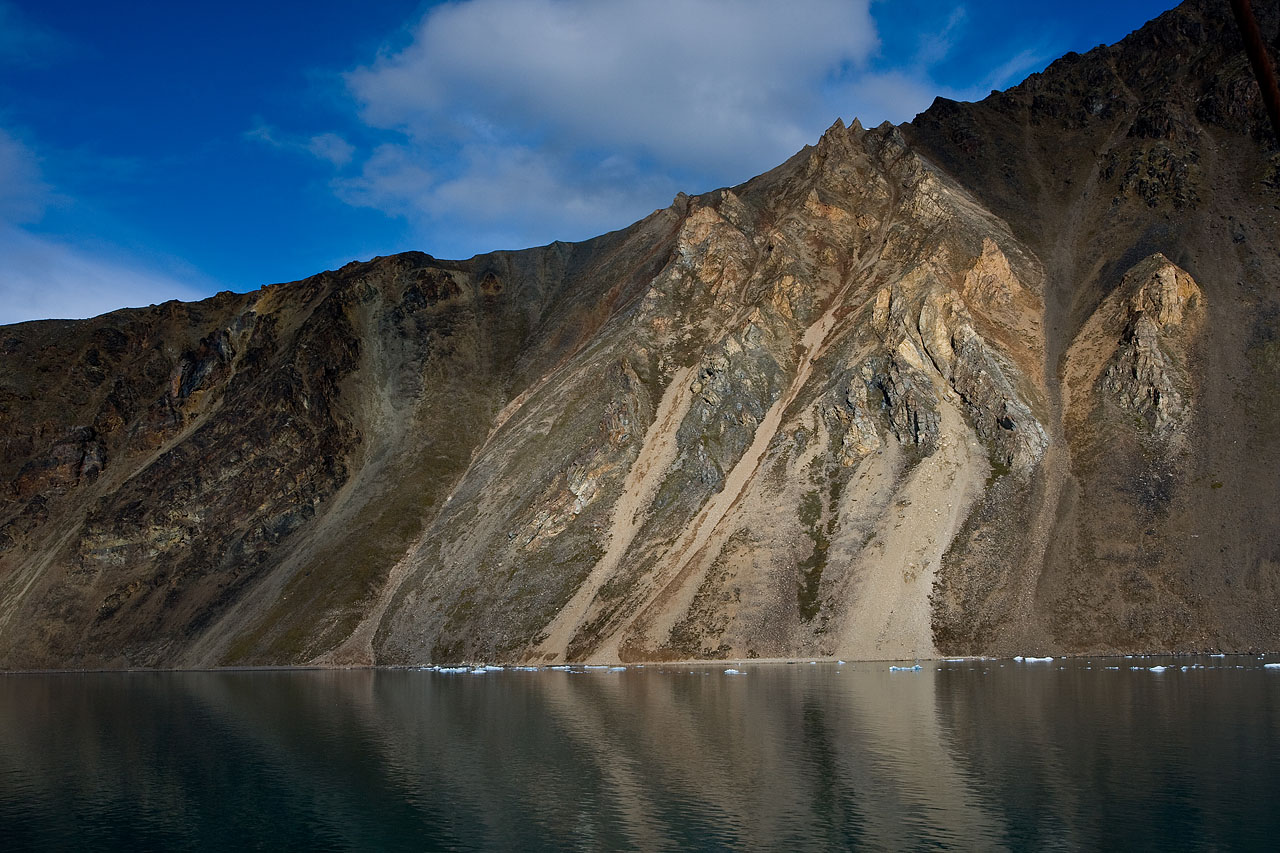
Krossfjorden.

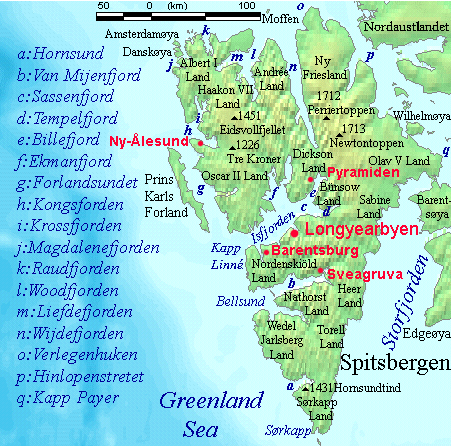
Krossfjorden (labeled i) lies on Spitsbergen's west coast.

Krossfjorden (English: Cross Fjord) is a 30 km long fjord on the west coast of Spitsbergen, which is the largest and only permanently populated island of the Svalbard archipelago in Norway. To the north, the fjord branches into Lilliehöökfjorden, Möllerfjorden and Kollerfjorden. To the south it is separated from Kongsfjorden by a line from Collinsodden on Mitrahalvøya east to Kapp Guissez.

== History ==
The English explorer (and later whaler) Jonas Poole entered Krossfjorden in 1610, naming it Close Cove. The Englishman John Daniel labeled the fjord Closse Sound on a map of 1612. A small bay in the southwestern entrance of Krossfjorden, named Cross Road by Poole (1610) and now known as Ebeltofthamna, was the location of the first whaling station in Spitsbergen in 1611. The remains of a later, semi-permanent station have been found there as well on a long, low arm of the beach between the fjord and a lagoon. On the other side of the lagoon's mouth exists a graveyard from this period. The name of this small harbor soon referred to the fjord as a whole, resulting in the modern name of Krossfjorden.

The name originates from the placing of a cross by Poole in 1610 on the side of a hill a mile west of Ebeltofthamna, on which he wrote the day and year of his arrival, as well as who sent him.
