= Mitrahalvøya =

Peninsula in Svalbard, Norway

Coordinates: 79.2123°N 11.3800°E

Mitrahalvøya is a 23 kilometer long peninsula in Albert I Land at Spitsbergen, Svalbard. The peninsula separates the fjord Krossfjorden and its western branch Lilliehöökfjorden from the sea.
