= Kurt Wegener =

German polar explorer and meteorologist

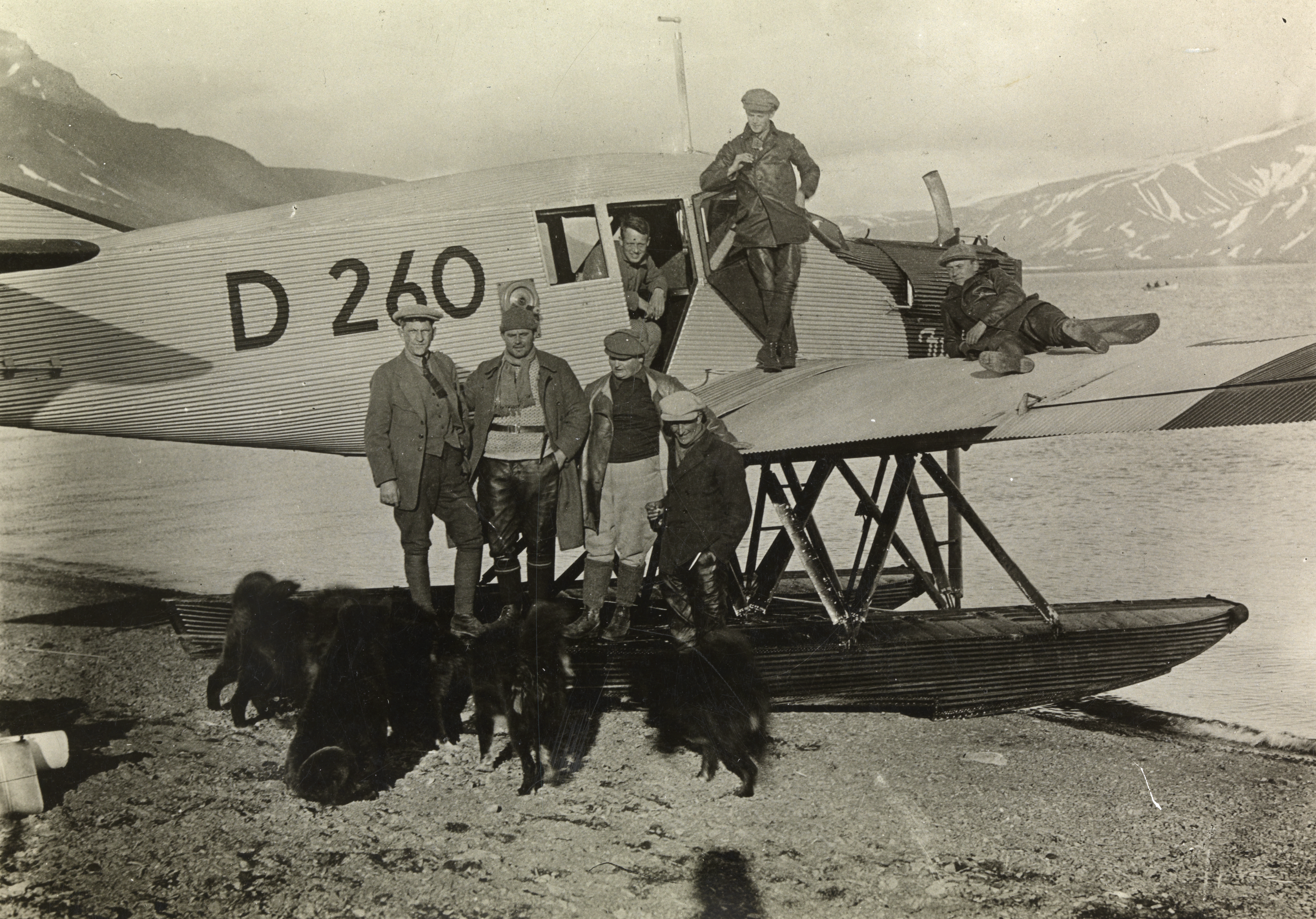
- Members of the expedition Junkers. Left to right : Kurt Wegener, A. Neumann, H.H. Marteau, F. Duus. Above: W. Löwe, Holbein, Wedekind (1923)
- Born: 3 April 1878
- Died: 29 February 1964 (aged 85)

Kurt Wegener (3 April 1878 – 29 February 1964) was a German meteorologist and polar explorer.

He was the brother of Alfred Wegener and the cousin of Paul Wegener. He worked at the Meteorological Observatory Lindenberg near Beeskow with his brother.

== See also ==
- German Greenland Expedition
