= Donald Duff =

Donald Duff may refer to:

- Donald Duff (surgeon) (1893–1968), Scottish surgeon and mountain rescue pioneer
- Donald Duff (geologist) (1927–1998), Scottish geologist and academic author
