= Expanding Earth =

Historical theory in geology

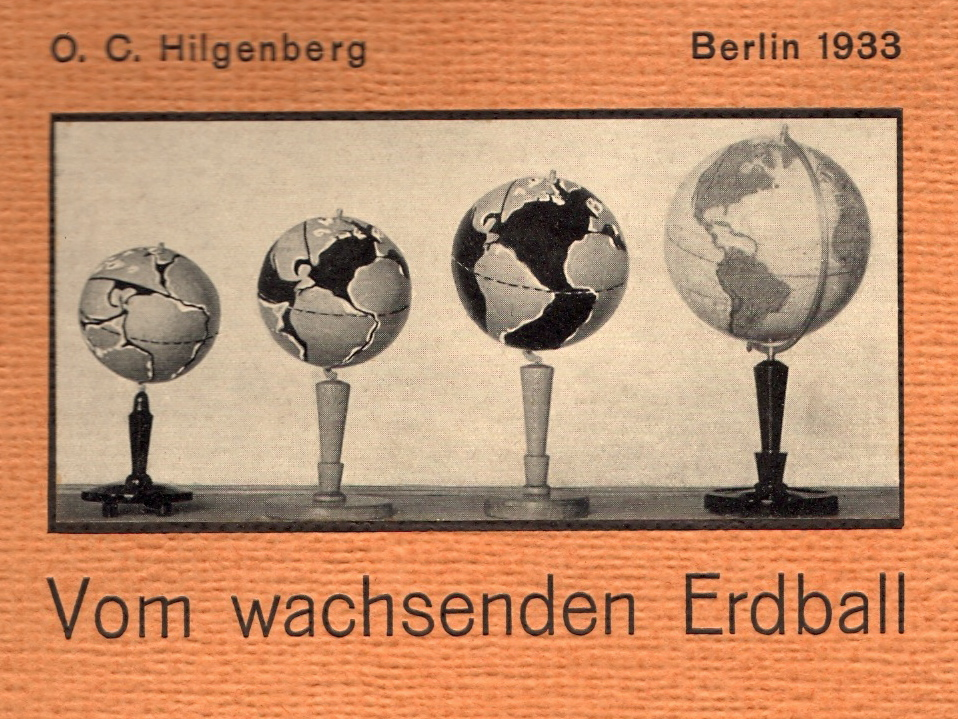
Historical Hilgenberg globes

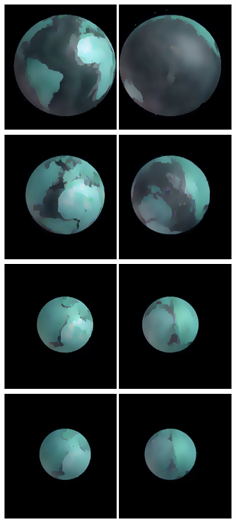
Potential reconstruction of continents bordering the Atlantic (left column) and Pacific (right column) oceans as they might have appeared at different points, going back in history, using the expanding Earth hypothesis, based on reconstructions by expanding Earth proponent Neal Adams

The expanding Earth or growing Earth was a hypothesis attempting to explain the position and relative movement of continents by increase in the volume of Earth. With the recognition of plate tectonics in the 20th century, the idea has been abandoned and considered a pseudoscience.

== Different forms of the hypothesis ==
=== Expansion with constant mass ===
In 1834, during the second voyage of HMS Beagle, Charles Darwin investigated stepped plains featuring raised beaches in Patagonia which indicated to him that a huge area of South America had been "uplifted to its present height by a succession of elevations which acted over the whole of this space with nearly an equal force". While his mentor Charles Lyell had suggested forces acting near the crust on smaller areas, Darwin hypothesized that uplift at this continental scale required "the gradual expansion of some central mass" [of the Earth] "acting by intervals on the outer crust" with the "elevations being concentric with form of globe (or certainly nearly so)". In 1835 he extended this concept to include the Andes Mountains as part of a curved enlargement of the Earth's crust due to "the action of one connected force". Not long afterwards, he abandoned this idea and proposed that as the mountains rose, the ocean floor subsided, explaining the formation of coral reefs.

In 1889 and 1909 Roberto Mantovani published a hypothesis of Earth expansion and continental drift. He assumed that a closed continent covered the entire surface of a smaller Earth. Thermal expansion caused volcanic activity, which broke the land mass into smaller continents. These continents drifted away from each other because of further expansion at the rip-zones, where oceans currently lie. Although Alfred Wegener noticed some similarities to his own hypothesis of continental drift, he did not mention Earth expansion as the cause of drift in Mantovani's hypothesis.

A compromise between Earth-expansion and Earth-contraction is the "theory of thermal cycles" by Irish physicist John Joly. He assumed that heat flow from radioactive decay inside Earth surpasses the cooling of Earth's exterior. Together with British geologist Arthur Holmes, Joly proposed a hypothesis in which Earth loses its heat by cyclic periods of expansion. By their hypothesis, expansion caused cracks and joints in Earth's interior that could fill with magma. This was succeeded by a cooling phase, where the magma would freeze and become solid rock again, causing Earth to shrink.

=== Mass addition ===
In 1888 Ivan Osipovich Yarkovsky suggested that some sort of aether is absorbed within Earth and transformed into new chemical elements, forcing the celestial bodies to expand. This was associated with his mechanical explanation of gravitation. Also the theses of Ott Christoph Hilgenberg (1933, 1974) were based on absorption and transformation of aether-energy into normal matter.

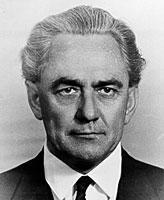
Samuel Warren Carey

After initially endorsing the idea of continental drift, Australian geologist Samuel Warren Carey advocated expansion from the 1950s (before the idea of plate tectonics was generally accepted) to his death, alleging that subduction and other events could not balance the sea-floor spreading at oceanic ridges, and describing yet unresolved paradoxes that continue to plague plate tectonics. Starting in 1956, he proposed some sort of mass increase in the planets and said that a final solution to the problem is only possible by cosmological processes associated with the expansion of the universe.

Bruce Heezen initially interpreted his work on the mid-Atlantic ridge as confirming S. Warren Carey's Expanding Earth Theory, but later ended his endorsement, finally convinced by the data and analysis of his assistant, Marie Tharp. The remaining proponents after the 1970s, like the Australian geologist James Maxlow, are mainly inspired by Carey's ideas.

To date no scientific mechanism of action has been proposed for this addition of new mass. Although the earth is constantly acquiring mass through accumulation of rocks and dust from space such accretion, however, is only a minuscule fraction of the mass increase required by the growing earth hypothesis.

=== Decrease of the gravitational constant ===
Paul Dirac suggested in 1938 that the universal gravitational constant had decreased during the billions of years of its existence. This caused German physicist Pascual Jordan to propose in 1964, a modification of the theory of general relativity, that all planets slowly expand. Analysis of observations of 580 type Ia supernovae shows that the gravitational constant has varied by less than one part in ten billion per year over the last nine billion years thus excluding Jordan's idea.

=== Formation from a gas giant ===
According to the hypothesis of J. Marvin Herndon (2005, 2013) the Earth originated in its protoplanetary stage from a Jupiter-like gas giant. During the development phases of the young Sun, which resembled those of a T Tauri star, the dense atmosphere of the gas giant was stripped off by infrared eruptions from the sun. The remnant was a rocky planet. Due to the loss of pressure from its atmosphere it would have begun a progressive decompression. Herndon regards the energy released due to the lack of compression as a primary energy source for geotectonic activity, to which some energy from radioactive decomposition processes was added. He terms the resulting changes in the course of Earth's history by the name of his theory Whole-Earth Decompression Dynamics. He considered seafloor spreading at divergent plate boundaries as an effect of it. In his opinion mantle convection as used as a concept in the theory of plate tectonics is physically impossible. His theory includes the effect of solar wind (geomagnetic storms) as cause for the reversals of the Earth magnetic field. The question of mass increase is not addressed.

=== Other ===
The debate is further complicated by the choice of the Dirac large numbers hypothesis cosmologies: In 1978, G. Blake argued that paleontological data is consistent with the "multiplicative" scenario but not the "additive" scenario.

A handful of studies consider obituary of the expanding Earth theory as a whole must be considered premature at this time, and point to recent space geodetic and gravimetric studies as evidence.

== Main arguments against Earth expansion ==
The hypothesis had never developed a plausible and verifiable mechanism of action. During the 1960s, the theory of plate tectonics— based initially on the assumption that Earth's size remains constant, and relating the subduction zones to burying of lithosphere at a scale comparable to seafloor spreading—became the accepted explanation in the Earth Sciences.

The scientific community finds that significant evidence contradicts the Expanding Earth theory, and that the evidence used for it is explained better by plate tectonics:

- Measurements with modern high-precision geodetic techniques and modeling of the measurements by the horizontal motions of independent rigid plates at the surface of a globe of free radius, were proposed as evidence that Earth is not currently increasing in size to within a measurement accuracy of 0.2 mm per year. The main author of the study stated "Our study provides an independent confirmation that the solid Earth is not getting larger at present, within current measurement uncertainties".
- The motions of tectonic plates and subduction zones measured by a large range of geological, geodetic and geophysical techniques helps verify plate tectonics.
- Imaging of lithosphere fragments within the mantle is evidence for lithosphere consumption by subduction.
- Paleomagnetic data has been used to calculate that the radius of Earth 400 million years ago was 102 ± 2.8 percent of the present radius.
- Examinations of data from the Paleozoic and Earth's moment of inertia suggest that there has not been any significant change of Earth's radius during the last 620 million years.

== See also ==
- Geophysical global cooling - a converse hypothesis
- Category:Plate tectonics
- Timeline of the development of tectonophysics (before 1954)
- Timeline of the development of tectonophysics (after 1952)
- List of topics characterized as pseudoscience

== Notes ==
=== Bibliography ===
- Carey, S.W.; 1976: "The Expanding Earth", Developments in Geotectonics (10), Elsevier, ISBN 0-444-41485-1; digital edition 2013: ASIN B01E3II6VY.
- Carey, S.W.;1988: "Theories of the Earth and Universe: A History of Dogma in the Earth Sciences", Stanford University Press, ISBN 0-804-71364-2.
- Duff, D.; 1993: Holmes' principles of physical geology, Chapman & Hall (4th ed.), ISBN 0-412-40320-X.
- Fowler, C.M.R.; 1990: The Solid Earth, an introduction to Global Geophysics, Cambridge University Press, ISBN 0-521-38590-3.
- Stanley, S.M.; 1999: Earth System History, W.H. Freeman & Co, ISBN 0-7167-2882-6.
