= Rajlich =

Rajlich is a surname. Notable people with the surname include:

- Iweta Rajlich (born 1981), Polish chess player
- Petr Rajlich (born 1944), Czech geologist
- Vasik Rajlich (born 1971), American chess player

== See also ==
- Rajsich
