= Marie Tharp =

American oceanographer and cartographer (1920–2006)

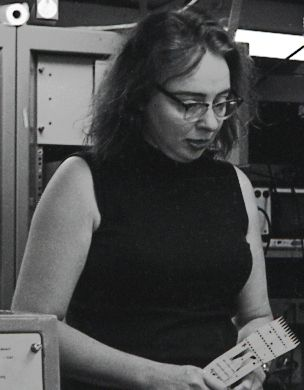
- Marie Tharp in 1968
- Born: July 30, 1920; Ypsilanti, Michigan, U.S.
- Died: August 23, 2006 (aged 86); Nyack, New York, U.S.
- Education: Ohio University; University of Michigan; University of Tulsa
- Known for: Seafloor topography
- Scientific career
- Fields: Geology, Oceanography
- Workplaces: Lamont–Doherty Earth Observatory Columbia University

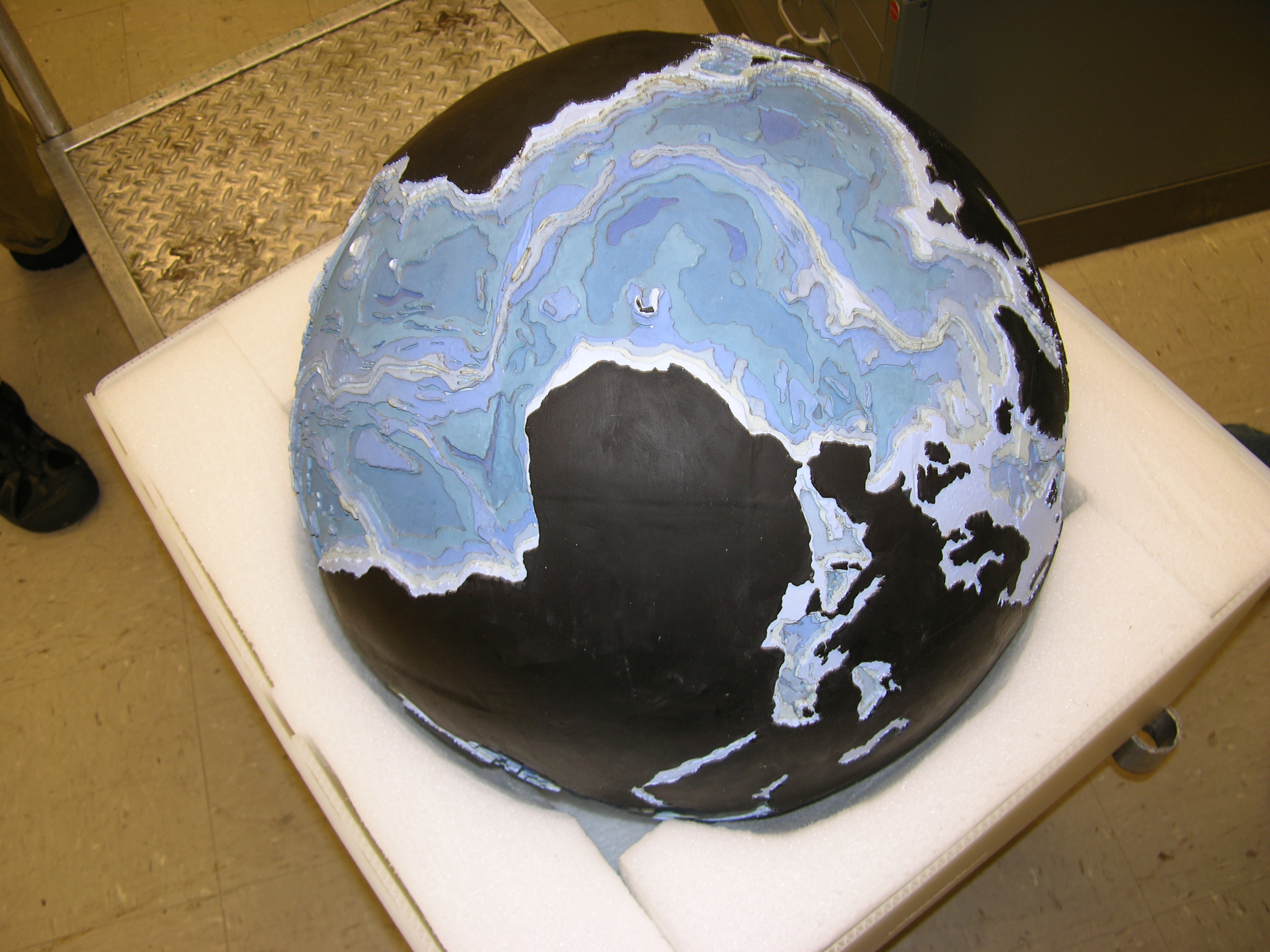
Bathymetric globe produced by Marie Tharp and Bruce Heezen

Manuscript map created by Tharp and Heezen depicting the early developments of the understanding of the ocean's bottom (1957)

Marie Tharp (July 30, 1920 – August 23, 2006) was an American geologist and oceanographic cartographer. In the 1950s, she collaborated with geologist Bruce Heezen to produce the first scientific map of the Atlantic Ocean floor. Her cartography revealed a more detailed topography and multi-dimensional geographical landscape of the ocean bottom.

Tharp's discovery of the Mid-Atlantic Ridge caused a paradigm shift in earth science that led to the acceptance of the theories of plate tectonics and continental drift.

== Early life, family and education ==
Marie Tharp was born on July 30, 1920, in Ypsilanti, Michigan, the only child of Bertha Louise Tharp, a German and Latin teacher; and William Edgar Tharp, a soil surveyor for the United States Department of Agriculture. She often accompanied her father on his fieldwork, which gave her an early introduction to mapmaking.

Due to the nature of William Tharp's work, the family constantly moved until he retired in 1931. At that point, Marie had attended over 17 public schools in Alabama, Iowa, Michigan and Indiana, which made it difficult for her to establish friendships. Her mother, who died when Marie was 15, was her closest female acquaintance. A full school year in Florence, Alabama, was particularly influential for her. She attended a class, Current Science, in which she learned about contemporary scientists and their research projects. In addition, she undertook school field trips on weekends to study trees and rocks.

After her father's retirement, Marie and her family moved to a farm in Bellefontaine, Ohio, where she graduated from the local high school. She spent gap years between high school and college working on her family's farm. She entered Ohio University in 1939, where she "changed her major every semester." Tharp graduated from in 1943 with bachelor's degrees in English and music and four minors.

After the Japanese attack on Pearl Harbor, many young men left schools and universities to join the armed forces. During World War II, more women were recruited into professions like petroleum geology, normally restricted to men. "With classrooms empty of men during the war years, Michigan—which had never allowed women into its geology program—was trying to fill seats," though less than 4% of all earth sciences doctorates at the time were obtained by women. Having taken a geology class at Ohio, Tharp enrolled in the petroleum geology program at the University of Michigan, where she completed a master's degree in 1944.

While working as a geologist for the Stanolind Oil company, Tharp enrolled in the faculty of mathematics at the University of Tulsa, obtaining her second bachelor of science degree.

== Career ==
After graduating from University of Michigan with her master's degree, Tharp worked as a junior geologist at the Stanolind Oil company in Tulsa, Oklahoma, but she discovered that the company did not permit women to do nor attend fieldwork. The company only permitted Tharp to coordinate maps and data for male colleagues' trips. Tharp spent four years in Tulsa, working and furthering her education, then moved to New York City in 1948. She initially sought work at the American Museum of Natural History, and later looked for positions at Columbia University because of how time-consuming paleontological research was. She was hired to perform drafting work with Maurice Ewing, the founder of the Lamont Geological Observatory (now the Lamont–Doherty Earth Observatory). Curiously, when interviewed for the job, Tharp did not mention she had a master's degree in geology. She was one of the first women to work at Lamont Geological Observatory.

While there, she met Bruce Heezen, and in early work together, they used photographic data to locate downed military aircraft from World War II. Eventually she worked for Heezen exclusively, plotting the ocean floor. In 1964, due to a professional disagreement between Ewing and Heezen, Ewing cut off Heezen's access to Lamont data, and then fired Tharp. She continued to work on mapping projects from her home, being paid by Heezen through navy contracts.

For the first 18 years of their collaboration, Heezen collected bathymetric data aboard the research ship Vema, while Tharp drew maps from that data since women were barred from working on ships at the time. She was later able to join a 1968 data-collection expedition on the USNS Kane. She independently used data collected from the Woods Hole Oceanographic Institution's research ship Atlantis, and seismographic data from undersea earthquakes. Her work with Heezen represented the first systematic attempt to map the entire ocean floor.

As early as the mid-19th century, a submarine mountain range in the Atlantic had been roughly outlined by John Murray and Johan Hjort. Marie Tharp also discovered the rift valley on her more precise graphical representations of the Mid-Atlantic Ridge, which were based on new measurement data obtained with the echo sounder. It took her a year to convince Bruce Heezen of this. Later, she also mapped the other mid-ocean ridges.

== Continental drift theory ==
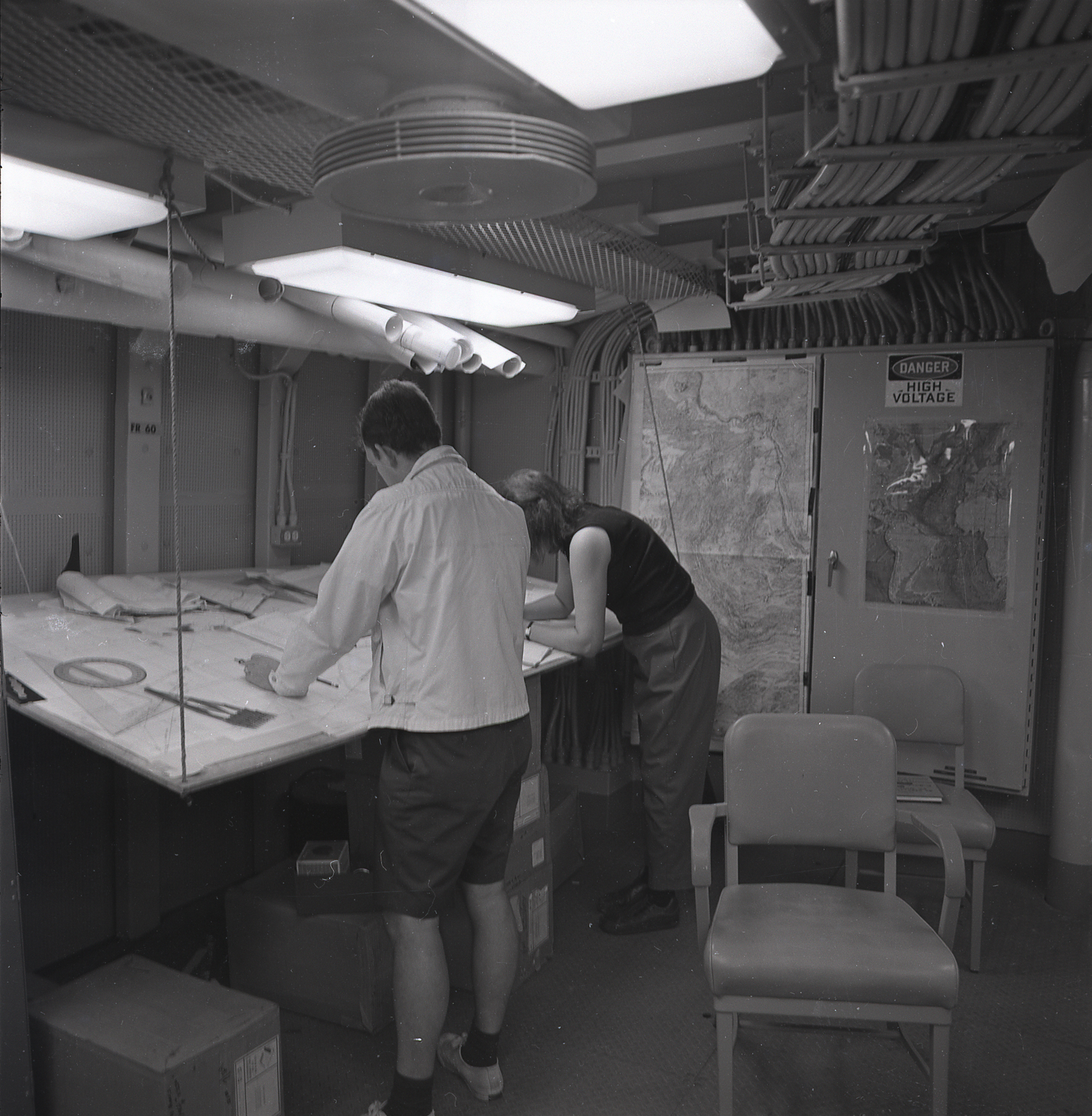
Don Blomquist and Marie Tharp at the drafting table in 1968 below deck on the USNS Kane; maps of the Mid-Atlantic ridge can be seen

Before the early 1950s, scientists knew very little about the ocean floor structure. Though studying geology on land was cheaper and easier, the overall structure of the Earth could not be understood without knowledge of the structure and evolution of the seafloor.

In 1952, Tharp painstakingly aligned sounding profiles from Atlantis, acquired during 1946–1952, and one profile from the naval ship Stewart acquired in 1921. She created approximately six profiles stretching west to east across the North Atlantic. From these profiles, she examined the bathymetry of the northern sections of the Mid-Atlantic Ridge. Tharp identified an aligned, v-shaped structure running continuously through the axis of the ridge and believed that it might be a rift valley formed by the oceanic surface being pulled apart. Heezen was initially unconvinced as the idea would have supported continental drift, then a controversial theory. Many scientists, including Heezen, believed that continental drift was impossible at the time. Instead, for a time, he favored the Expanding Earth hypothesis, dismissing her explanation as "girl talk".

Heezen soon hired Howard Foster to plot the location of earthquake epicenters in the oceans for a project relating large-scale turbidity currents to undersea earthquakes. The creation of this earthquake epicenter map proved to be a useful secondary dataset for examining the bathymetry of the Mid-Atlantic Ridge. When Foster's map of earthquake epicenters was overlaid with Tharp's profile of the Mid-Atlantic Ridge, it became clear that the location of these earthquakes aligned with Tharp's rift valley. After putting together these two datasets, Tharp became convinced that a rift valley existed within the crest of the Mid-Atlantic Ridge. It was only after seeing that the location of earthquake epicenters aligned with Tharp's rift valley that Heezen accepted her hypothesis and turned to the alternative theories of plate tectonics and continental drift.

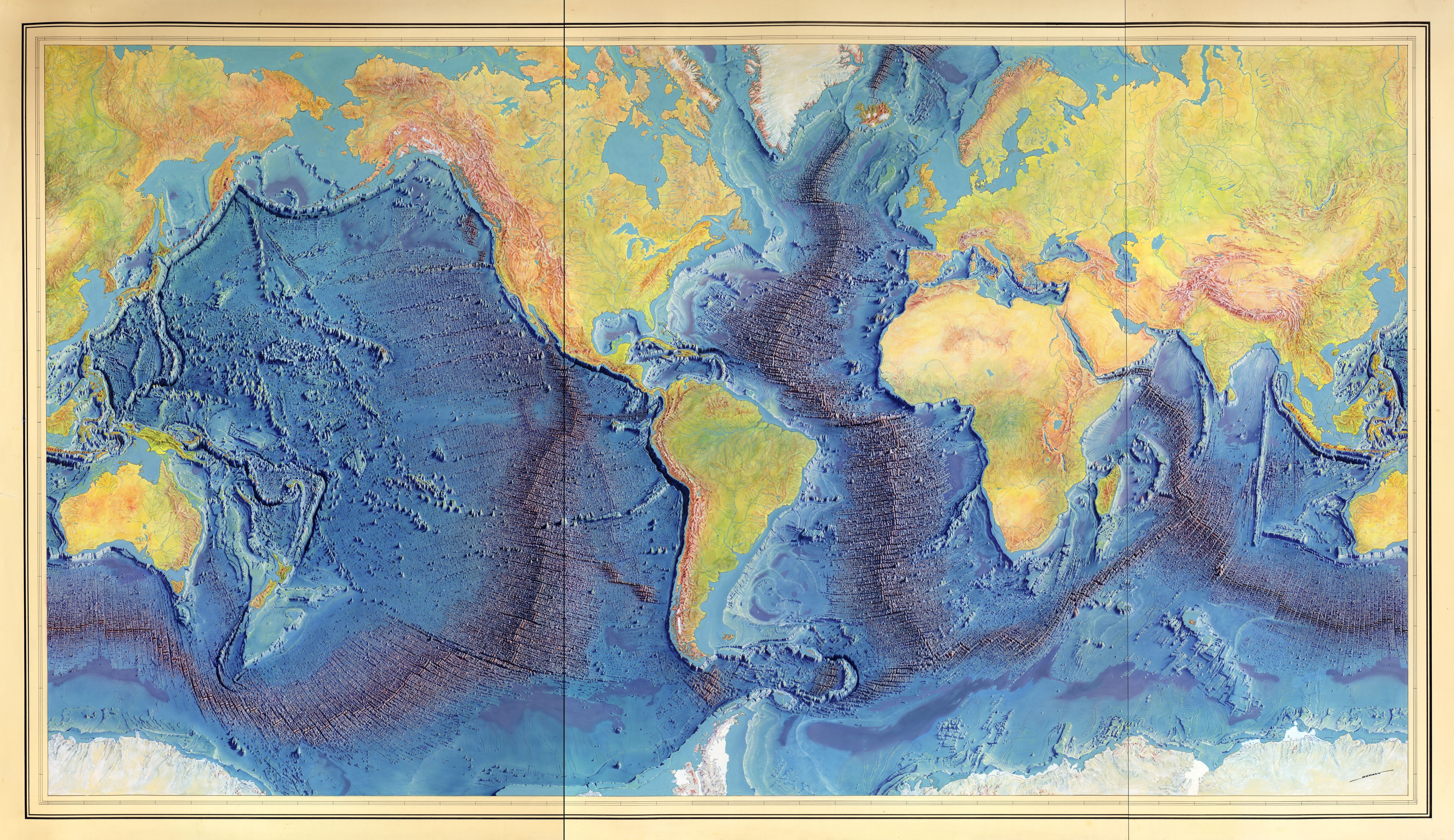
Painting of the Mid-Ocean Ridges by Heinrich Berann (1977) based on the scientific profiles of Marie Tharp and Bruce Heezen

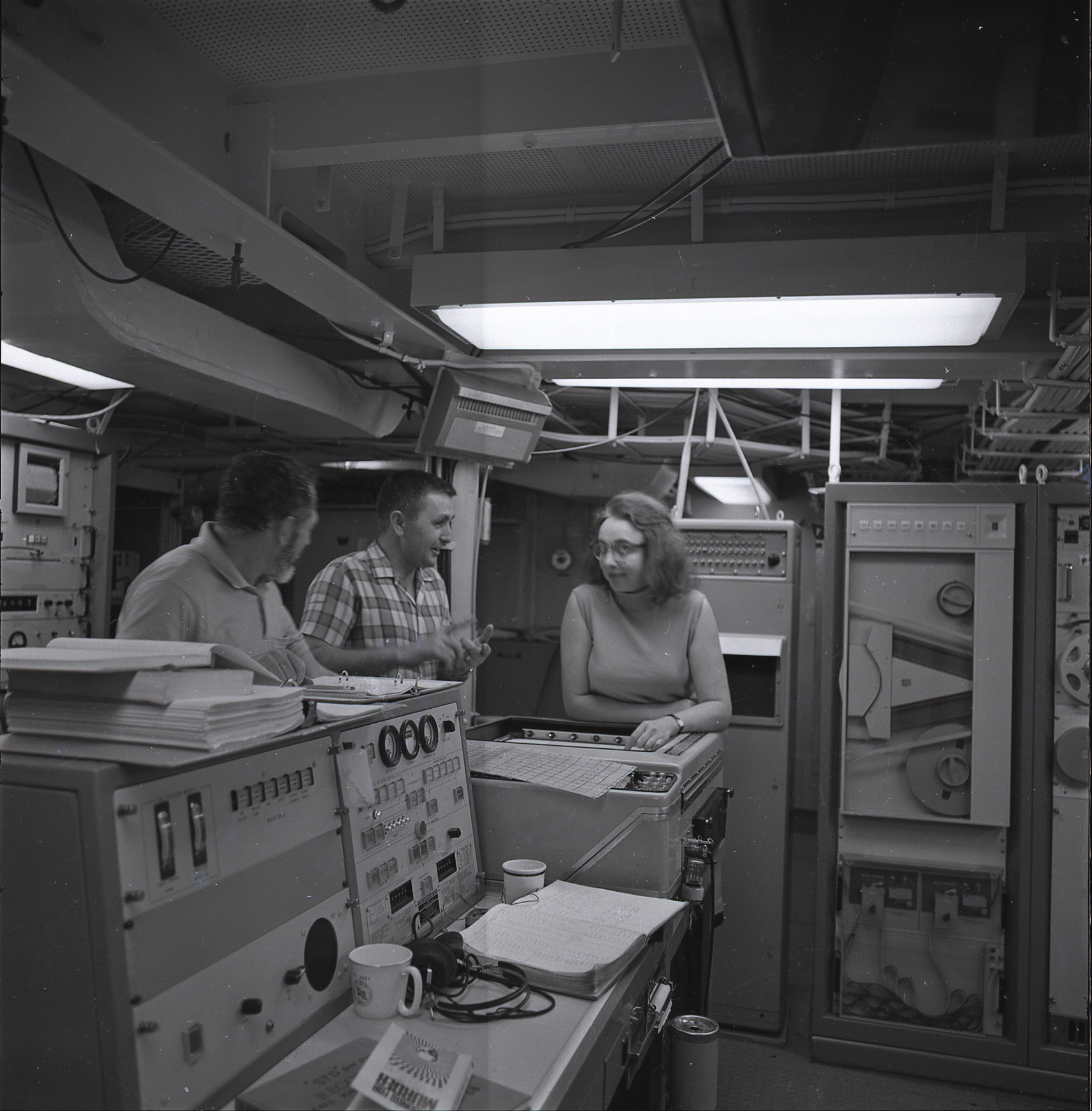
Marty Weiss, Al Ballard, and Marie Tharp conversing on the maiden voyage of the USNS Kane, c. 1968

Because of the Cold War, the U.S. government forbade topographic seafloor maps to be published for fear that Soviet submarines could use them. To circumvent that restriction, Tharp and Heezen decided to draw their maps in a more realistic style, and published their first physiographic map of the North Atlantic in 1957. Tharp's name did not appear on any of the major papers on plate tectonics that Heezen and others published between 1959 and 1963. Tharp continued working with graduate student assistants to further map the extent of the central rift valley. Tharp demonstrated that the rift valley extended along with the Mid-Atlantic Ridge into the South Atlantic, and found a similar valley structure in the Indian Ocean, Arabian Sea, Red Sea, and Gulf of Aden, suggesting the presence of a global oceanic rift zone. Subsequently, in collaboration with the Austrian landscape painter Heinrich Berann, Tharp and Heezen realized their map of the entire ocean floor, which was published in 1977 by National Geographic under the title of The World Ocean Floor.

== Retirement and death ==
After Heezen's death, Tharp continued to serve on the faculty of Columbia University until 1983, after which she operated a map-distribution business in South Nyack during her retirement. Tharp donated her map collection and notes to the Map and Geography Division of the Library of Congress in 1995. In 2001, Tharp was awarded the first annual Lamont–Doherty Heritage Award at her home institution for her life's work as a pioneer of oceanography.

Tharp died of cancer in Nyack, New York, on August 23, 2006, at the age of 86.

== Personal life ==
In 1948, she married David Flanagan and moved with him to New York. They divorced in 1952.

== Awards and honors ==
Like many scientists, Marie Tharp was recognized mainly later in life. Her awards include:

- 1978 – National Geographic Society's Hubbard Medal
- 1996 – Society of Woman Geographers Outstanding Achievement Award
- 1999 – Woods Hole Oceanographic Institution's Mary Sears Woman Pioneer in Oceanography Award
- 2001 – Lamont–Doherty Earth Observatory Heritage Award

== Legacy ==
Tharp was recognized in 1997 by the Library of Congress as one of the four greatest cartographers of the 20th century. The position of Marie Tharp Lamont Research Professor was created in her honor.

=== Marie Tharp Fellowship ===
Created by Lamont in 2004, the Marie Tharp Fellowship is a competitive academic visiting fellowship awarded to women to work with researchers at the Earth Institute of Columbia University. Women who are accepted are given the opportunity to work with faculty, research staff, postdoctoral researchers and graduate students and in the duration of 3 months, they are awarded up to $30,000 as financial aid.

=== Posthumous recognition ===
Google Earth included the Marie Tharp Historical Map layer in 2009, allowing people to view Tharp's ocean map using the Google Earth interface. She is the subject of the 2013 biography by Hali Felt entitled Soundings: The Story of the Remarkable Woman Who Mapped the Ocean Floor, which was cited by the New York Times for its standing as an "eloquent testament both to Tharp's importance and to Felt's powers of imagination."

She was animated in "The Lost Worlds of Planet Earth", the ninth episode of Neil deGrasse Tyson's Cosmos: A Spacetime Odyssey, and voiced by actress Amanda Seyfried. The episode depicts her discovery of the Mid-Atlantic Ridge. Later in the episode, deGrasse Tyson recognized Tharp not only as an influential scientist who happens to be a woman but also as one who should be recognized as a scientist who overcame sexism to contribute to her field.

In 2015 the International Astronomical Union named the Tharp Moon crater in her honor.

Her life story is told in several children's books, including Marie's Ocean: Marie Tharp Maps the Mountains under the Sea (Macmillan 2020), written and illustrated by Josie James, which was honored as a National Science Teaching Association Best STEM Book of 2021 and a National Council for the Social Studies 2021 Notable Social Studies Trade Book for Young Readers.

Poet Jessy Randall's 2022 collection Mathematics for Ladies includes a poem honoring Tharp.

In 2022 the non-profit Ocean Research Project named their 72ft research schooner after her.

On November 21, 2022, Google honored Tharp by releasing a Google Doodle, which included narration, mini-games, and animations, telling the story of Tharp's discovery of continental drift and providing historical context for her work.

On March 8, 2023 (International Women's Day), the U.S. Secretary of the Navy, Carlos Del Toro, announced the renaming of a ship in Tharp's honor, becoming USNS Marie Tharp (T-AGS-66).

== Selected publications ==
- Tharp, Marie; Heezen, Bruce C.; Ewing, Maurice (1959). The floors of the oceans: I. The North Atlantic. Vol. 65. Geological Society of America. doi:10.1130/SPE65-p1.
- Heezen, B C; Bunce, Elizabeth T; Hersey, J B; Tharp, Marie (1964). "Chain and Romanche fracture zones". Deep-Sea Research and Oceanographic Abstracts. 11 (1): 11–33. Bibcode:1964DSRA...11...11H. doi:10.1016/0011-7471(64)91079-4.
- Heezen, B C; Tharp, Marie (1965). "Tectonic fabric of the atlantic and indian oceans and continental drift". Philosophical Transactions of the Royal Society of London A. 258 (1088): 90–106. Bibcode:1965RSPTA.258...90H. doi:10.1098/rsta.1965.0024. S2CID 121476006.
- Tharp, Marie; Friedman, Gerald M (2002). "Mapping the world ocean floor". Northeastern Geology and Environmental Sciences. 24 (2): 142–149..
