= Rajsich =

Rajsich is a surname. Notable people with the surname include:

- Dave Rajsich (born 1951), American baseball pitcher
- Gary Rajsich (born 1954), American baseball player and scout
- Rhonda Rajsich (born 1978), American racquetball player

== See also ==
- Rajlich
