= Petr Rajlich =

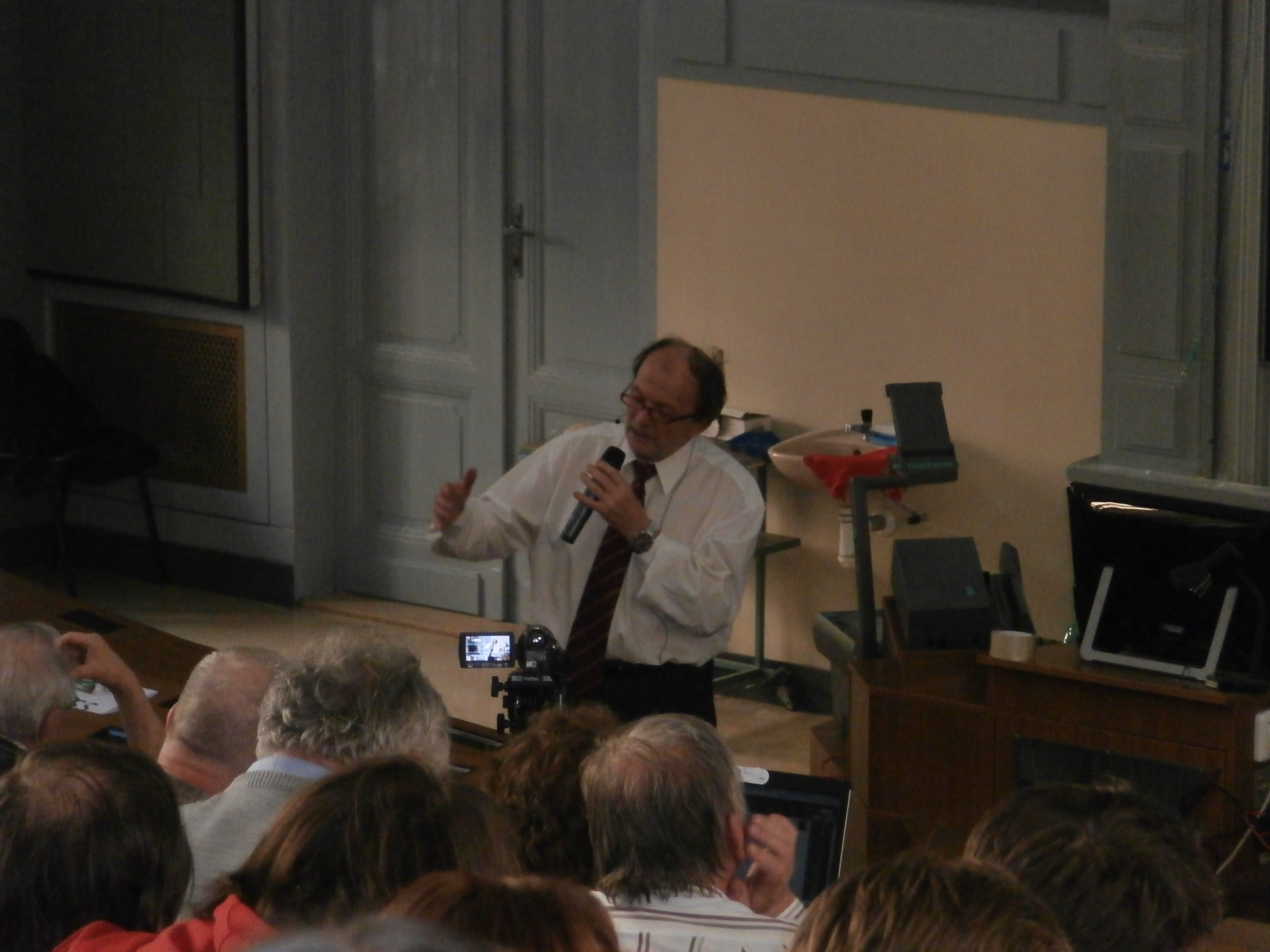
- Petr Rajlich is giving a lecture at the Faculty of Science, Charles University in Prague.
- Born: February 20, 1944 (age 81); Prague, Czechoslovakia
- Citizenship: Czech
- Known for: Rajlich's Hypothesis; Czech Crater; Expanding Earth
- Scientific career
- Fields: Geology

Petr Rajlich (born 20 February 1944 in Prague) is a Czech geologist and popularizer of science.

Rajlich published many books and scientific papers mainly oriented to structural end economic geology. He studied at the Faculty of Science, Charles University in Prague, and got a doctoral degree there.
