= Bruce C. Heezen =

American geologist (1924–1977)

Bruce Charles Heezen
- Marie Tharp and Heezen
- Born: April 11, 1924; Vinton, Iowa, US
- Died: June 21, 1977 (aged 53)
- Education: University of Iowa; Columbia University
- Known for: Seafloor topography
- Awards: Cullum Geographical Medal (1973); Walter H. Bucher Medal (1977)
- Scientific career
- Fields: Geology, Oceanography
- Workplaces: Lamont–Doherty Earth Observatory

Bruce Charles Heezen (/ˈheɪzən/; April 11, 1924 – June 21, 1977) was an American geologist. He worked with oceanographic cartographer Marie Tharp at Columbia University to map the Mid-Atlantic Ridge in the 1950s.

== Biography ==
Heezen was born in Vinton, Iowa. An only child, he moved at age six with his parents to Muscatine, Iowa, where he graduated from high school in 1942. He received his B.A. from the University of Iowa in 1947. He received his M.A. in 1952 and a Ph.D in 1957 from Columbia University.

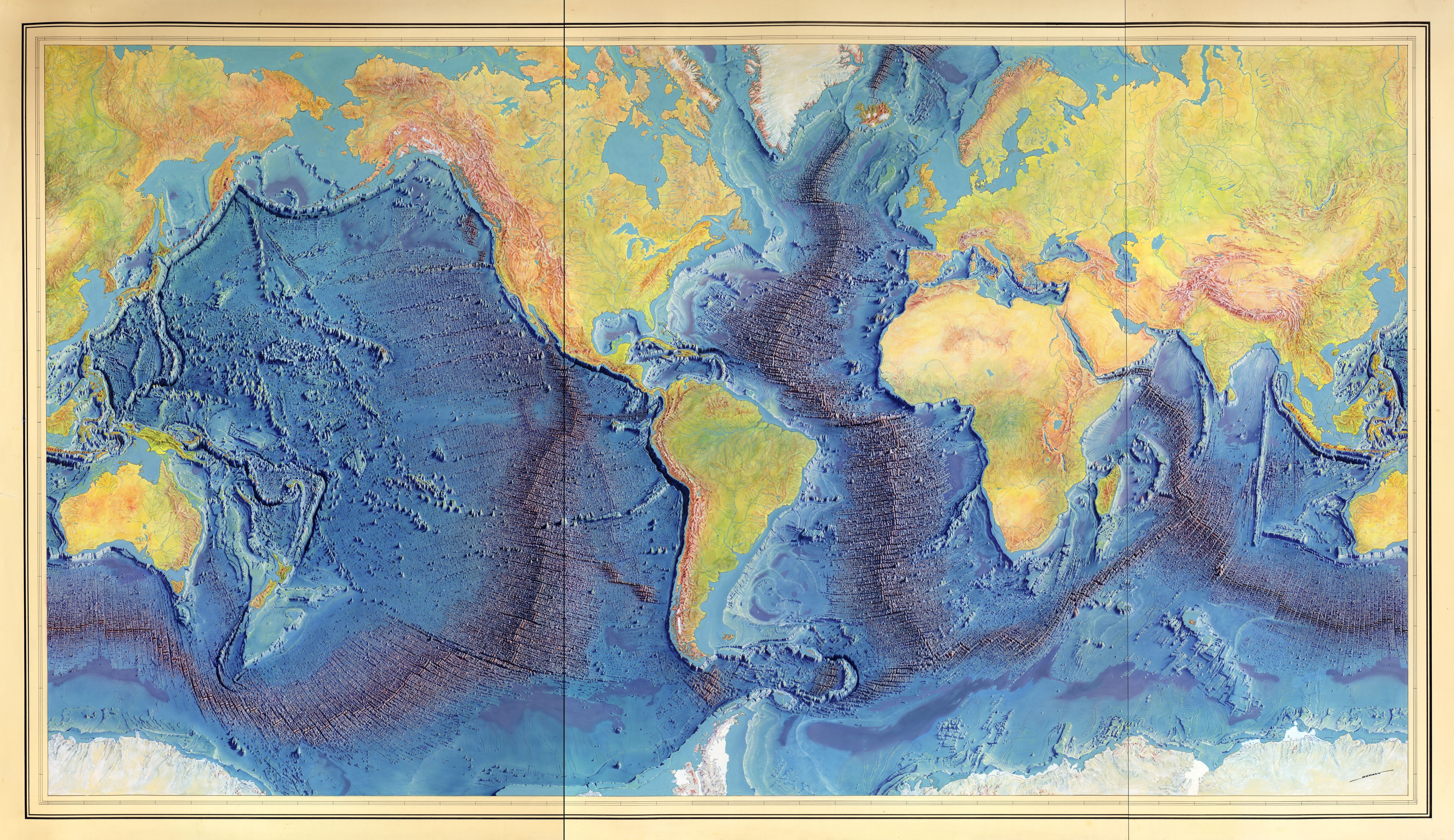
Painting of the Mid-Ocean Ridges by Heinrich Berann (1977) based on the scientific profiles of Marie Tharp and Bruce Heezen

Heezen collaborated extensively with cartographer Marie Tharp. He interpreted their joint work on the Mid-Atlantic ridge and the East Pacific Rise as supporting S. Warren Carey's Expanding Earth Theory, developed in the 1950s, but under Tharp's influence "eventually gave up the idea of an expanding earth for a form of continental drift in the mid-1960s." Tharp was Heezen's assistant while he was a graduate student and he gave her the task of drafting seafloor profiles. When she showed Heezen that her plotting of the North Atlantic revealed a rift valley, Heezen initially dismissed it as "girl talk." Eventually they discovered that not only was there a North Atlantic rift valley, but a mountain range with a central valley that spanned the earth. They also realized that the oceanic earthquakes they had been separately plotting fell within the rift, a revolutionary theory at the time. He presented this mid-ocean rift and earthquake theory as his own work at Princeton in 1957.

Heezen died of a heart attack in 1977 while on a research cruise to study the Mid-Atlantic Ridge near Iceland aboard the NR-1 submarine.

== Honors and awards ==
- 1964: Henry Bryant Bigelow Medal in Oceanography awarded by the Woods Hole Oceanographic Institution
- 1973: Cullum Geographical Medal awarded by the American Geographical Society
- 1977: Walter H. Bucher Medal awarded by the American Geophysical Union

The Oceanographic Survey Ship USNS Bruce C. Heezen was christened in honor of him in 1999.

Heezen Canyon is a large underwater canyon in the NW Atlantic, on the edge of the continental shelf.

Heezen Glacier in Antarctica was named after him in 1977.
