= J. Marvin Herndon =

American scientist

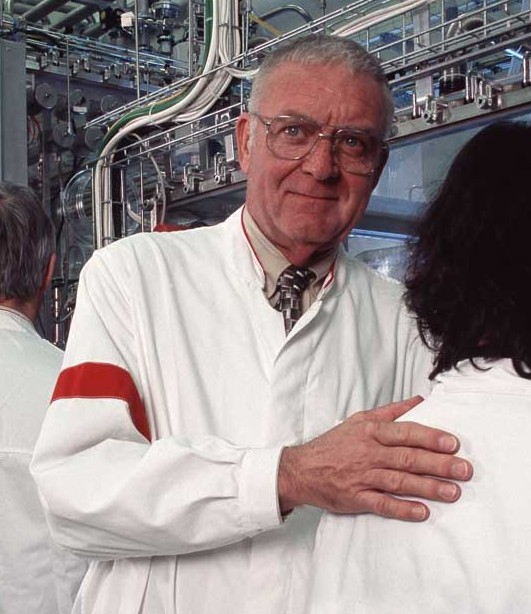

James Marvin Herndon (born 1944) is an American interdisciplinary scientist who earned his BA degree in physics in 1970 from the University of California, San Diego and his Ph.D. degree in nuclear chemistry in 1974 from Texas A&M University. For three years, J. Marvin Herndon was a post-doctoral assistant to Hans Suess and Harold C. Urey in geochemistry and cosmochemistry at the University of California, San Diego. He has been profiled in Current Biography, and dubbed a “maverick geophysicist” by The Washington Post.

== Theories on Earth ==
Herndon suggested that the composition of the inner core of Earth is nickel silicide; the conventional view is that it is iron–nickel alloy. In 1992, he suggested "georeactor" planetocentric nuclear fission reactors as energy sources for the gas giant outer planets, as the energy source and production mechanism for the geomagnetic field and stellar ignition by nuclear fission. Scientists who have scrutinised these ideas have challenged the underlying assumptions and proposed mechanisms. In a paper on the nuclear reactor hypothesis, Schuiling argues that 'it is unlikely that nuclear georeactors ... are operating at the Earth's centre'.

In 2005, Herndon postulated what he calls whole-earth decompression dynamics, which he describes as a unified theory combining elements of plate tectonics and Earth expansion. He suggests that Earth formed from a Jupiter-sized gas giant by catastrophic loss of its gaseous atmosphere with subsequent decompression and expansion of the rocky remnant planet resulting in decompression cracks at divergent continental margins which are filled in by basalts from mid-ocean ridges.

Recent measurements of "geoneutrino" fluxes in the KamLAND and Borexino experiments have placed stringent upper limits on Herndon's "georeactor" hypothesis on the presence of an active nuclear fission reactor in the Earth's inner core, so that such reactor would produce less than 3 TW.

== Chemtrail theory proponent ==
Herndon has become a proponent of the chemtrail conspiracy theory and published several peer-reviewed papers claiming that coal fly ash is being sprayed for geoengineering. In 2016, two of his papers, however, were retracted because of flaws; Herndon disputed the reason for retraction, claiming the retractions were "a well-organized effort (CIA?) to deceive... Those concerted efforts to cause said retractions prove that the high officials who ordered the spraying know very well that they are poisoning humanity and want to hide that fact".
