= Carmen Gaina =

Geophysicist

- Education: MSc, University of Bucharest, Romania; PhD, University of Sydney, Australia (1999)
- Scientific career
- Fields: Geophysicist
- Workplaces: Geological Survey of Romania, Bucharest, Romania (1987-1991); EarthByte group, School of Geosciences, University of Sydney, Australia (1995-2005); Centre for Geodynamics, Norwegian Geological Survey, Norway (2005-2011); Centre for Earth Evolution and Dynamics (CEED), University of Oslo, Norway (2011-)

Carmen Gaina is the Director of the Centre for Earth Evolution and Dynamics (CEED) a Norwegian Centre of Excellence hosted at the Department of Geosciences, University of Oslo, Norway.

Carmen is a geophysicist whose research includes deciphering Earth's crustal and mantle structure and evolution. Her expertise lies in combining geological and geophysical data of the oceans and continental margins. Her research also investigates the interaction of the solid Earth, oceans and atmosphere for the geological past by modelling paleo-bathymetry, sea-level and global geochemical budgets resulting from plate tectonics.

== Projects ==
She led projects involving compilations of large geophysical datasets including the Circum-Arctic Mapping Project part (CAMP-GM) of the new World Digital Magnetic Anomaly Map release (WDMAM). Previously Carmen was the team leader of the Centre for Geodynamics, Norwegian Geological Survey in Trondheim, Norway.

== The Centre for Earth Evolution ==
The Centre for Earth Evolution and Dynamics is dedicated to research of fundamental importance to the understanding of our planet, that embraces the dynamics of the plates, the origin of large-scale volcanism, the evolution of climates and the abrupt demise of life forms. The centre plays a leading role in the studies of Mantle dynamics using 3-D computer simulations, geological and geophysical observations.

== Awards ==
Elected Member of the Norwegian Academy of Science and Letters

== Selected publications ==
- Gaina, C., Blischke, A., Geissler, W.H., Kimbell, G.S. and O. Erlendsson, 2016, Seamounts and oceanic igneous features in the NE Atlantic: a link between plate motions and mantle dynamics, in The NE Atlantic Region: A Reappraisal of Crustal Structure, Tectonostratigraphy and Magmatic Evolution, eds. Peron-Pinvidic, G, Hopper, J. R., Stoker, M., Gaina, C., Doornebal, H., Funck, T., and U. Arting, Geol. Soc., London, Special Publications, 447. http://doi.org/10.1144/SP447.6
- Shephard, G., R. Trønnes, W. Spakman, I. Panet, and C. Gaina, 2016, Evidence for a distinct slab under Greenland and links to North Atlantic and Arctic magmatism, Geophysical Research Letters, 43, doi:10.1002/2016GL068424
- Gaina, C., Nikishin, A.M., and, E.I. Petrov, 2015, Ultraslow spreading, ridge relocation and compressional events in the East Arctic region – A link to the Eurekan orogeny?, Arktos, doi:10.1007/s41063-015-0006-8.
- Gaina, C, D. van Hinsbergen, and W, Spakman, 2015, Reconstruction of the Arabia-India plate boundary since the Jurassic from marine geophysical, geological and seismic tomographic constraints, Tectonics, doi:0.1002/2014TC003780.
- Gaina, C., S. Medvedev, T. H. Torsvik, I. Koulakov, and S. C. Werner, 2013, 4D Arctic: A Glimpse into the structure and evolution of the Arctic in the light of new geophysical maps, plate tectonics and tomographic models, 2013, Surveys in Geophysics, doi:10.1007/s10712-013-9254y.
- Seton, M.; Müller, R.D.; Zahirovica, S.; Gaina, C.; Torsvik, T.; Shephard, G.; Talsma, A.; Gurnis, M.; et al. (2012). "Global continental and ocean basin reconstructions since 200 Ma". Earth-Science Reviews. 113 (3–4): 212–270. Bibcode:2012ESRv..113..212S. doi:10.1016/j.earscirev.2012.03.002.
- Torsvik, Trond Helge; Steinberger, Bernhard; Gurnis, Michael; Gaina, Carmen (2010). "Plate tectonics and net lithosphere rotation over the past 150 My" (PDF). Earth and Planetary Science Letters. 291 (1–4): 106–112. Bibcode:2010E&PSL.291..106T. doi:10.1016/j.epsl.2009.12.055. Archived from the original (PDF) on 2011-05-16. Uses a moving hotspot frame after 100 Ma.
- Müller, R. Dietmar; Sdrolias, Maria; Gaina, Carmen; Steinberger, Bernhard; Heine, Christian (7 March 2008). "Long-Term Sea-Level Fluctuations Driven by Ocean Basin Dynamics". Science. 319 (5868): 1357–1362. Bibcode:2008Sci...319.1357M. doi:10.1126/science.1151540. PMID 18323446. S2CID 23334128.
- Torsvik, Trond H.; Müller, R. Dietmar; Van Der Voo, Rob; Steinberger, Bernhard; Gaina, Carmen (2008). "Global plate motion frames: Toward an unified model". Reviews of Geophysics. 46 (RG3004): 44. Bibcode:2008RvGeo..46.3004T. doi:10.1029/2007RG000227. hdl:2027.42/94772.
- Whittaker, J.; Mueller, R. Dietmar; Sdrolias, M., Leitchenchov; G., Stagg, H.; Gaina, Carmen; Goncharov, A. (5 October 2007). "Major Australian-Antarctic plate reorganization at Hawaiian-Emperor bend time". Science. 318 (5847): 83–86. Bibcode:2007Sci...318...83W. doi:10.1126/science.1143769. PMID 17916729. S2CID 129191964.
- Steinberger, Bernhard; Gaina, Carmen (2007). "Plate tectonic reconstructions predict part of Hawaiian hotspot track to be preserved in Bering Sea" (PDF). Geology. 35 (5): 407–410. Bibcode:2007Geo....35..407S. doi:10.1130/G23383A.1. Archived from the original (PDF) on 2011-07-23.
- Gaina, Carmen; Müller, R. Dietmar; Brown, B.; Ishihara, T. and S. Ivanov (2007). "Breakup and early seafloor spreading between India and Antarctica". Geophysical Journal International. 170 (1): 151–169. Bibcode:2007GeoJI.170..151G. doi:10.1111/j.1365-246X.2007.03450.x.
- Gaina, Carmen; Mueller, R. Dietmar (2007). "Cenozoic tectonic and depth/age evolution of the Indonesian gateway and associated back-arc basins" (PDF). Earth-Science Reviews. 83 (3–4): 177. Bibcode:2007ESRv...83..177G. doi:10.1016/j.earscirev.2007.04.004. Archived from the original (PDF) on 2011-07-26.
- Gaina, Carmen; R. Dietmar Müller; J.-Y. Royer; J. Stock; J. Hardebeck; P. Symonds (1998). "The tectonic history of the Tasman Sea: A puzzle with thirteen pieces". Journal of Geophysical Research. 103 (B6): 12413–12433. Bibcode:1998JGR...10312413G. doi:10.1029/98JB00386.
