= Donald Duff (surgeon) =

Scottish surgeon and mountain rescue pioneer

Donald Gordon Duff MBE MC FRCSE (1893 – 11 October 1968) was a Scottish surgeon and mountain rescue pioneer.

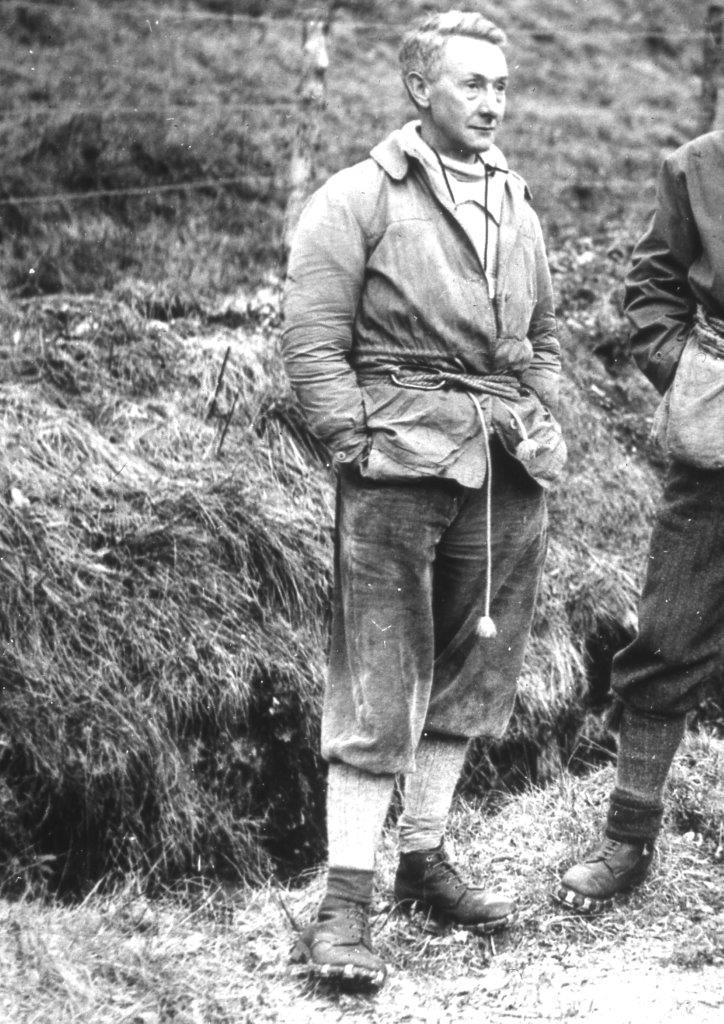
Donald Duff, surgeon and mountain rescue pioneer

== Formative years ==
Duff was born in Edinburgh in 1893 and educated at The Royal High School of Edinburgh. He studied medicine at The University of Edinburgh, graduating in 1916.

== Military service ==
On graduating he joined the Royal Army Medical Corps and served at the Battle of the Somme. In 1918 he was awarded the Military Cross. His citation in the London Gazette reads, Capt. Donald Gordon Duff, M.B., R.A.M.C., Spec. Res.For conspicuous gallantry and devotion to duty. He proceeded to an area that was being heavily shelled, and at once organised stretcher parties, superintended the conveyance of wounded to his dug-out, and returned to make certain that no casualties were left. His coolness and devotion to duty throughout have been most marked.

== 1919–1945 ==
Donald Duff served in India in 1919-20. He became a fellow of the Royal College of Surgeons of Edinburgh in 1922 and held a number of positions; Senior Resident Surgeon at Craigleith Ministry of Pensions Hospital, Senior House Surgeon Leith Hospital, House Surgeon at Salford Royal Hospital and the Surgeon at Denbighshire Infirmary in North Wales. He worked in North Wales for 23 years and took charge of two Red Cross Hospitals and The Civil Defence Medical Services in Denbightshire. During The Second World War he became a Lt-Col in The Home Guard.

== Mountain rescue ==
Donald Duff began climbing in Snowdonia, mainly with the Midland Mountaineering Association, took part in mountain recues in N. Wales, and designed the stretcher that bore his name. In 1945 he became a general surgeon in the Belford Hospital, Fort William and joined The Scottish Mountaineering Club, he became involved in mountain rescue both as a rescuer and a surgeon treating casualties. In 1945 he assumed leadership of Lochaber Mountain Rescue Team, Scotland's first civilian volunteer team, started the previous year by the Rev. Bob Clark and Sergeant Roddy Fraser. Clark had moved on to become the first principal of Glenmore Lodge. The following year he patented his light weight mountain stretcher. The Duff stretcher rapidly became standard equipment in Scottish Mountain rescue until replaced by that designed by Hamish MacInnes. The Scottish Mountain Heritage Collection based at Roy Bridge has an example that was kept at the Steall Hut in Glen Nevis His S.M.C. obituary notes that a Duff stretcher was taken on the 1953 Everest expedition, something in which he took pride. In 1956 Duff received the M.B.E. for services to medicine.

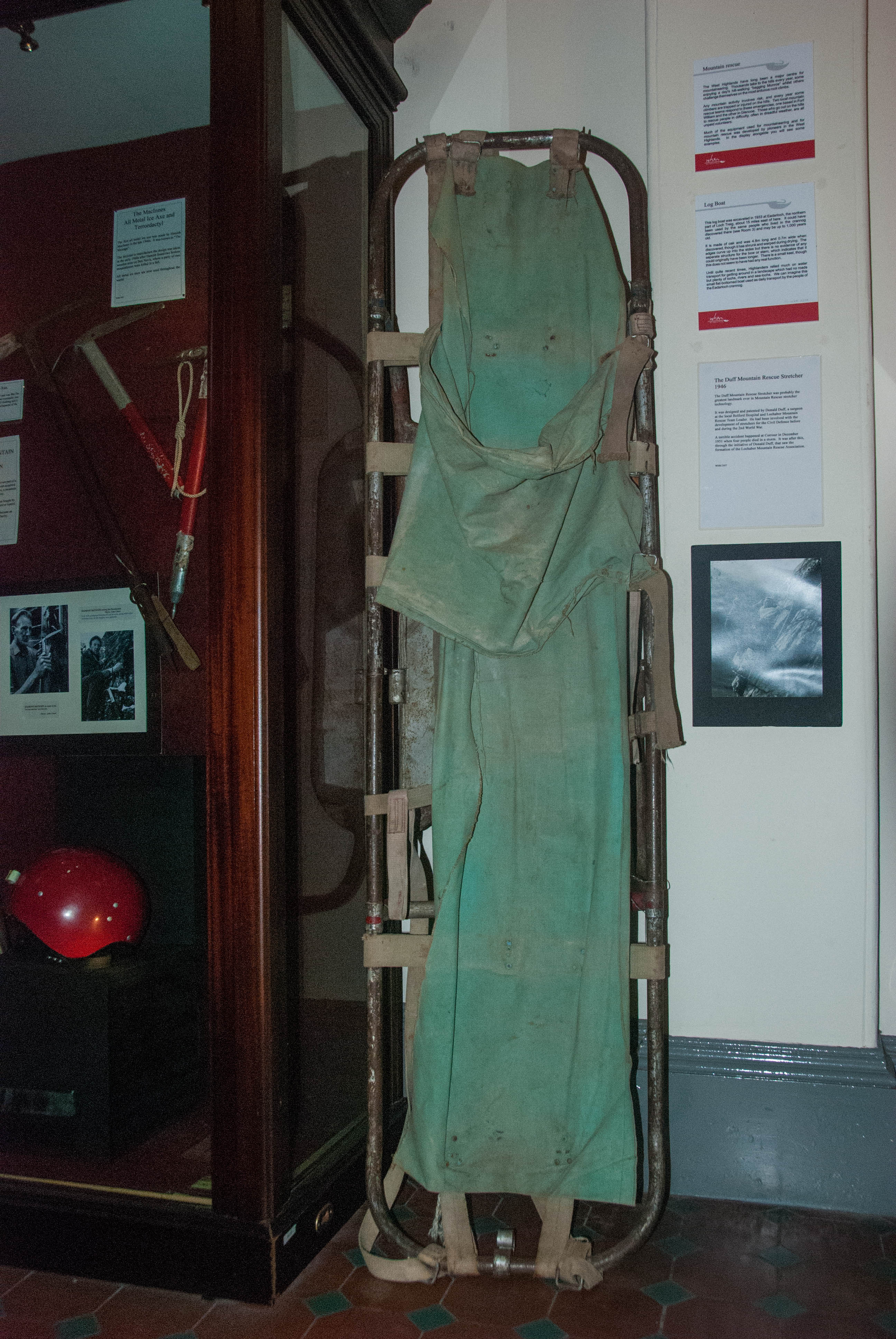
A Duff Stretcher in the West Highland Museum, Fort William

Walter Elliot wrote that the Glen Coe MRT was started by himself. Hamish MacInnes and Donald Duff. Surgeon’s Gully, once called Strawberry Chasm, on the Glen Nevis side of Ben Nevis is named in honour of Mr Duff who explored many of the Glen Nevis Gullies.

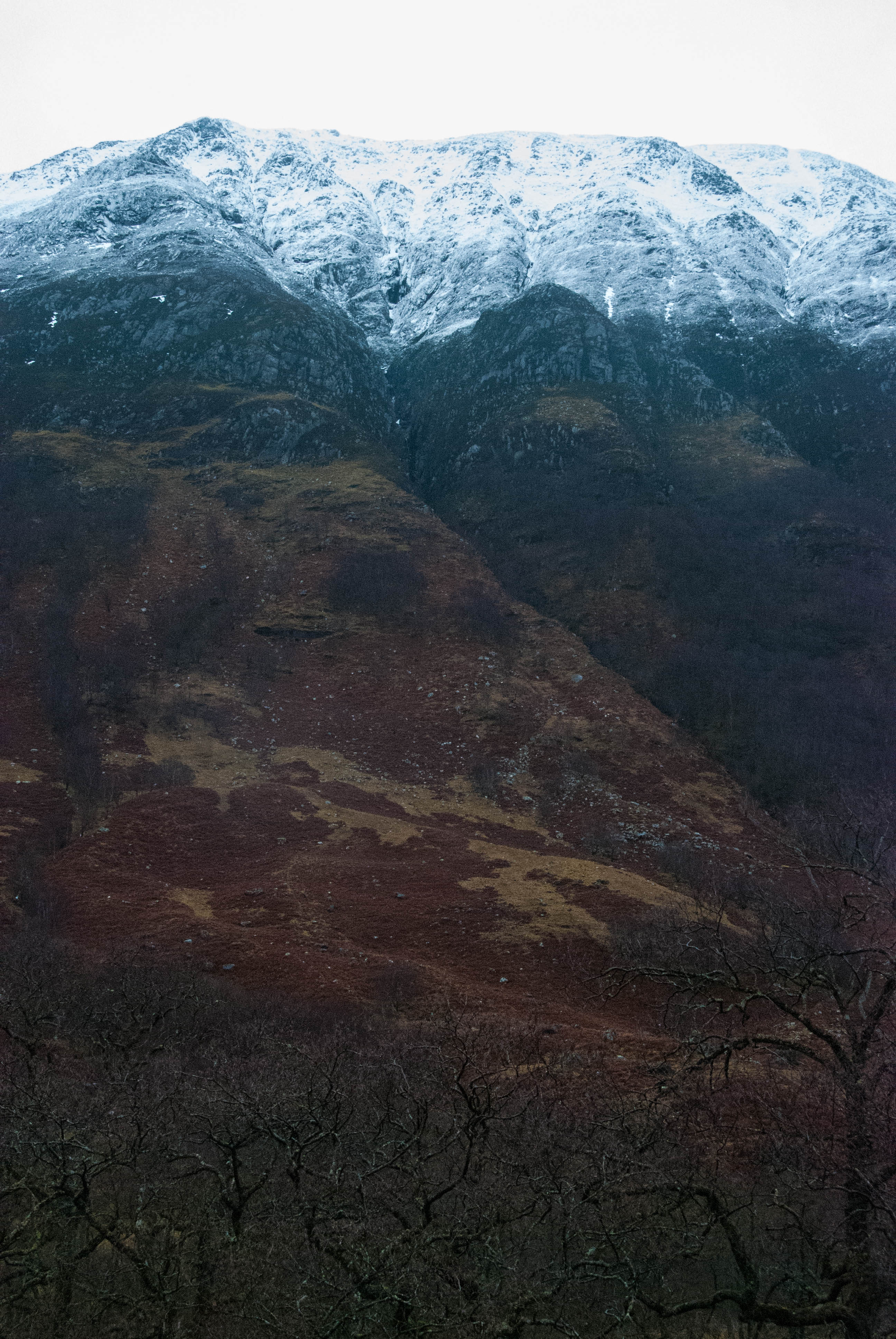
Surgeon's gully in Glen Nevis. Named in honour of Donald Duff

== Character and personality ==
In his obituary of Duff in the SMCJ Dr John Berkeley recounts how he first met him cycling in to work in the Belford on an old bike on a foul day. Scorning hardship, never wearing a coat in the coldest weather Duff never ceased to work on maintaining his own fitness. In the same journal Duff himself wrote Modelling ourselves on Hollywood as usual, we will soon spend our whole lives warmly enclosed and quiescent, mechanical transportation ensuring that our muscles atrophy even as we travel He regretted the passing of former generations of Highland people who had been at home on the hill and moved easily over the ground on foot. He was also concerned about modern eating habits and lifestyle, writing we deny ourselves the proper outlet of physical effort. No wonder, then, with toxic pollution of the air and over-eating (especially of sugar – unknown a generation or two back in the Highlands) our whole body chemistry is knocked awry. Berkeley noted, however, that Duff was always very approachable by his patients, not, apparently, a common trait at the time. In her autobiography Gwen Moffat recalled that Mr Duff was sympathetic and re-assuring as he plastered the leg she had broken descending from a winter traverse of the Aonach Eagach.

== The Belford Hospital ==
The post of surgeon at the Belford was advertised in 1944 at a salary of £800 and Mr Duff was appointed in 1945. His report to the Board on appointment praised the cleanliness and artistic orderliness of the hospital but highlighted serious problems with the facilities, most notably the lack of a physiotherapy room, inadequate maternity facilities, the lack of an anteroom to the operating theatre for anaesthetising patients and a mortuary likely to be "starkly repellent to bereaved relatives". In 1945, his first year in post, he recommended that a new hospital should be built. In 1950 the hospital board began to look for a new site. Planning was underway by 1957. Work began in 1962 and the new hospital opened in 1965. In the meantime Mr Duff retired and was succeeded by Mr Iain Campbell in 1959.

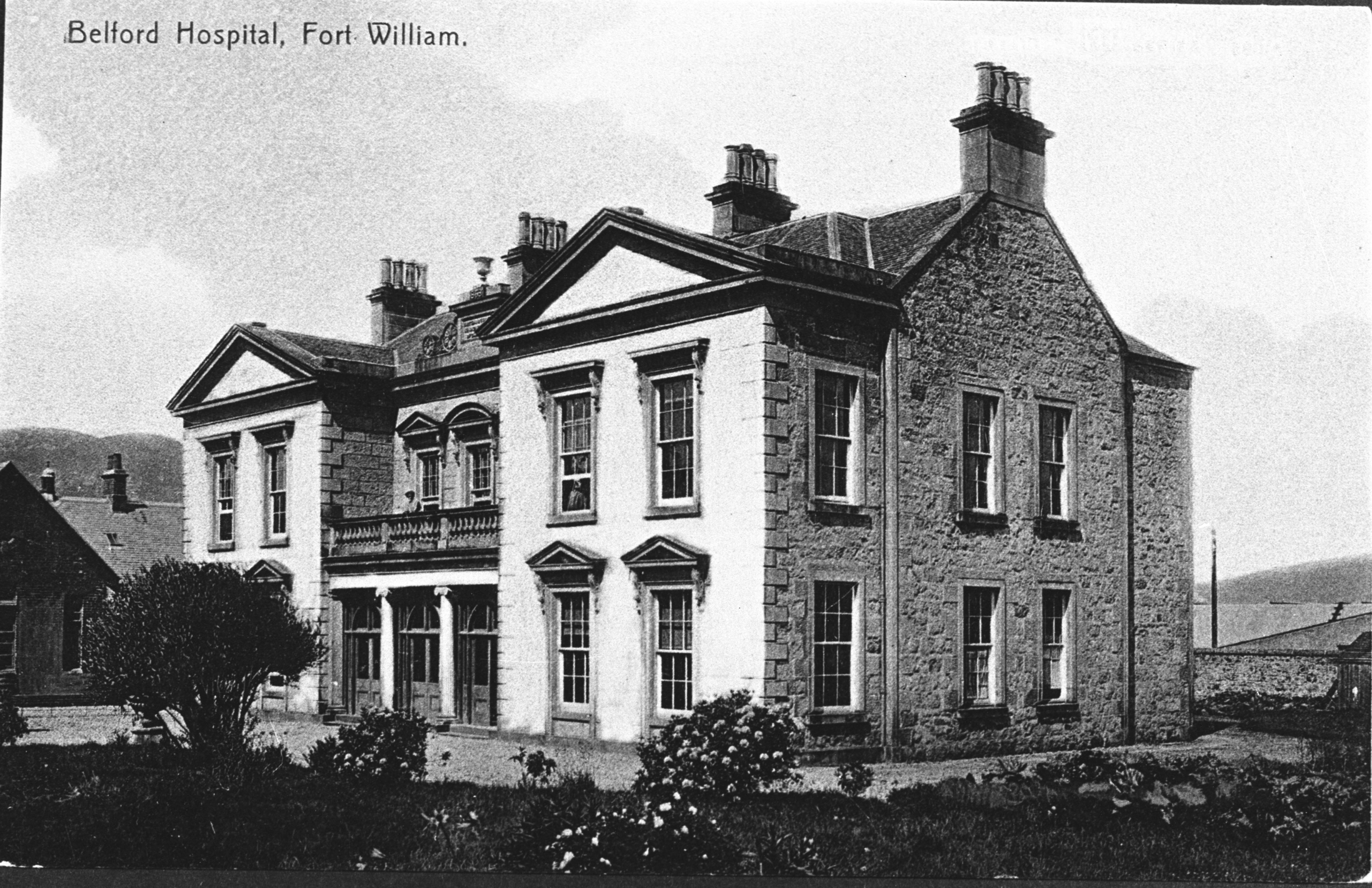
The hospital in which Donald Duff was the surgeon

He was appointed Hon Sheriff Substitute for Inverness-shire in 1945 and served as a member of the North Regional Hospital Board from 1954-1959.

== Death ==
He died in Oban on 11 October 1968.
