= Heinrich C. Berann =

Austrian painter and cartographer

Heinrich Caesar Berann
- Born: 31 March 1915; Innsbruck, Tyrol, Austria-Hungary
- Died: 4 December 1999 (aged 84); Lans, Tyrol, Austria
- Resting place: Neuer Friedhof Mühlau, Innsbruck
- Education: Federal School of Art and Design in Innsbruck
- Spouse: Ludmilla Herold

Heinrich Caesar Berann (31 March 1915 – 4 December 1999) was an Austrian painter and cartographer. He achieved world fame with his panoramic maps that combined modern cartography with classical painting. His work includes maps of Olympic Games sites, of mountainous regions published in the National Geographic Magazine, and four panorama posters of national parks published by the U.S. National Park Service.

== Early life ==
Berann was born into a family of sculptors and painters in Innsbruck, in the County of Tyrol. Between 1930 and 1933, he studied painting at the Federal School of Art and Design in Innsbruck, but was unable to survive solely as a painter during the Great Depression. After graduating, he worked as a freelance artist and graphic designer.

In 1934 he won a competition to produce a panoramic map of Grossglockner High Alpine Road, a newly opened mountain road in Austria, which led to commissions to paint landscapes for cartographic or tourism purposes.

He married Ludmilla Herold in 1941. The couple had two daughters, Elisabeth and Angela. His military service in the German army, which sent him to Norway and northern Finland in 1942, also contributed to his artistic style.

== Painting career ==
He painted over a hundred maps, including works produced for the Olympic Games in Cortina d'Ampezzo for the 1956 Winter Olympics, Rome for the 1960 Summer Olympics, Innsbruck in 1964 Winter Olympics and 1976 Winter Olympics, Sarajevo for the 1984 Winter Olympics, and Nagano for the 1998 Winter Olympics. He also produced ski trail maps for European winter sports resorts, particularly in Austria, Italy, Switzerland, Germany and France.

In 1962 he painted Mount Everest for the National Geographic Society. He eventually painted about 20 maps for National Geographic including Mont Blanc (September 1965), five maps of the Leeward Islands (October 1966), Sky World of the Himalayas (October 1966), a map of the Pacific Ocean floor (October 1969), The Delta Project in the Netherlands (April 1968), Nepal (November 1971), and A Traveller's Map of the Alps (April 1985).

In 1977, he painted the topographic map of ocean floors by Marie Tharp and Bruce C. Heezen, continuing work he started at National Geographic. Their collaboration began with a panorama of the Indian Ocean (published in 1967), before progressing to other ocean basins and finally to the entire world.

Near the end of his career he painted four panoramas for the U.S. National Park Service of North Cascades National Park (1987), Yosemite National Park (1989), Yellowstone National Park (1991), and finally Denali National Park and Preserve (1994).

North Cascades National Park (1987)

Yosemite National Park (1989)

Yellowstone National Park (1991)

Denali National Park and Preserve (1994)

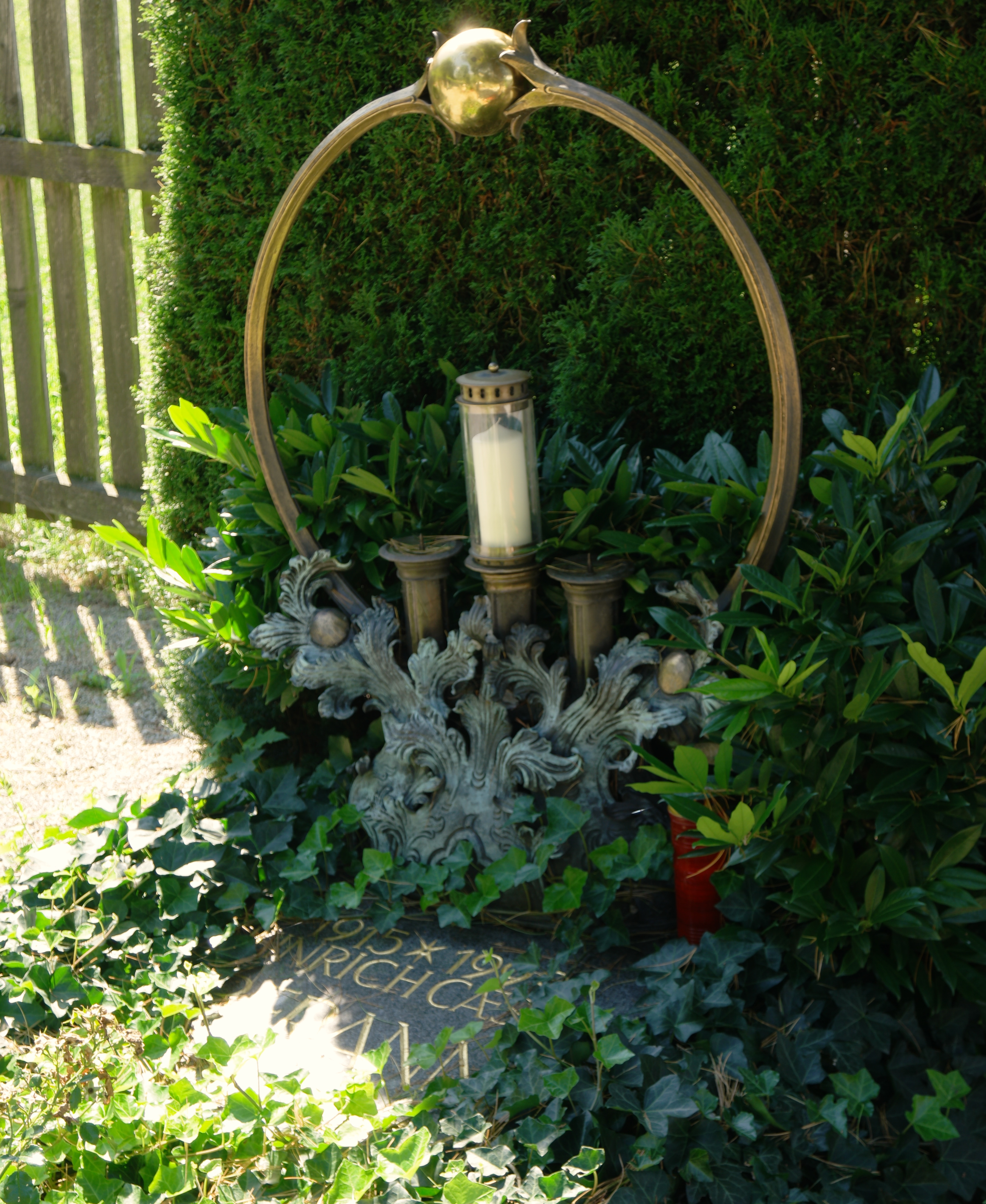
Grave in Innsbruck

He died in 1999 at age 84 in Lans, Tyrol, where he had lived since 1952.

== Style ==
He combined traditional and modern techniques to develop a style of "mountainscape painting" and the "modern panoramic map" that made him famous.

"There's just something absolutely magical about his panoramas," according to Tom Patterson, a senior cartographer for the U.S. National Park Service.

Berann used creative distortion in his work. For example his painting of Denali vertically exaggerated the heights by a factor of two, with additional exaggeration for the peak at the center of the painting. In his painting of Yellowstone National Park the size of the Old Faithful geyser and the park lodge were also exaggerated. Other distortions in his paintings include a visual opening up of the tightly packed canyons of North Cascades National Park.

His use of clouds on the horizon sometimes creates a vanishing-point effect or balances other objects on the horizon. He also emphasized lakes and other bodies of water, showing reflections of the mountains or glints of sunlight to attract the viewer's eye.

Colors in his paintings are extremely vivid when viewed up close, but when viewed from a normal distance mix into more natural hues.

His work was often painstaking. For example on his 1966 panorama of the Himalayas for National Geographic he observed the mountains extensively including flying around Mount Everest in a chartered plane. Mountain climbers gathered over 100 photos for his use. Berann then spent 600 hours to paint the mountainscape.
