= Arthur Holmes =

English geologist (1890 – 1965)

Arthur Holmes FRS FRSE
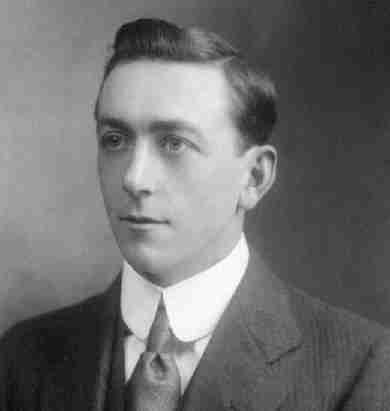
- Holmes around age 22
- Born: 14 January 1890; Hebburn, England
- Died: 20 September 1965 (aged 75); London, England
- Education: Imperial College London
- Awards: Murchison Medal (1940); FRS (1942); Wollaston Medal (1956); Penrose Medal (1956); Vetlesen Prize (1964)
- Scientific career
- Workplaces: Durham University (1924–1942); University of Edinburgh (1943–1956)

Arthur Holmes FRS FRSE (14 January 1890 – 20 September 1965) was an English geologist who made two major contributions to the understanding of geology. He pioneered the use of radiometric dating of minerals, and was the first earth scientist to grasp the mechanical and thermal implications of mantle convection, which led eventually to the acceptance of plate tectonics.

== Life ==
He was born in Hebburn, County Durham, near Newcastle upon Tyne, the son of David Holmes, a cabinet-maker, and his wife, Emily Dickinson.

As a child, he lived in Low Fell, Gateshead, and attended the Gateshead Higher Grade School (later Gateshead Grammar School). At 17, he enrolled to study physics at the Royal College of Science (now Imperial College London), but took a course in geology in his second year, which settled his future, against the advice of his tutors. After graduation, he took a job prospecting for minerals in Mozambique. After six months, with no discoveries, he became so ill with malaria that a notice of his death was posted home. However, he recovered enough to catch the boat home and became a demonstrator at Imperial College.

In 1910, Holmes took the examinations for entry to the civil service, seeking an appointment in the department of minerals at the British Museum (Natural History). In the competition, Holmes ranked second to Walter Campbell Smith, who won the post on the basis of a better performance in the Latin test.

He obtained his Doctorate of Science in 1917, and in 1920 he joined an oil company in Burma as chief geologist. The company failed, and he returned to England penniless in 1924. He had been accompanied in Burma by his three-year-old son, who contracted dysentery and died shortly before Holmes's departure.

He was head of the Department of Geology, Durham University, 1924–1943. He held the chair of geology at the University of Edinburgh from 1943–1956.

Holmes died at 20 St John's Avenue in Putney, London, on 20 September 1965, aged 75.

== Personal life ==
He married his first wife, Margaret Howe, in 1914. She died in 1938, and in the following year he married Doris Reynolds, a geologist who had joined the teaching staff at Durham. After his death, she edited the third edition of the Principles of Physical Geology.

== Age of the Earth ==
Holmes was a pioneer of geochronology, and performed the first accurate uranium-lead radiometric dating (specifically designed to measure the age of a rock) while an undergraduate in London, assigning an age of 370 Ma to a Devonian rock from Norway, improving on the work of Boltwood who published nothing more on the subject. This result was published in 1911, after his graduation in 1910.

1912 saw Holmes on the staff of Imperial College, publishing his famous book The Age of the Earth in 1913 in which he argued strongly for radioactive methods compared with methods based on geological sedimentation or cooling of the earth (many people still clung to Lord Kelvin's calculations of less than 100 Ma). He estimated the oldest Archean rocks to be 1,600 Ma, but did not speculate about the Earth's age. By this time the discovery of isotopes had complicated the calculations and he spent the next years grappling with these. His promotion of the theory over the next decades earned him the nickname of Father of modern geochronology. By 1927 he had revised this figure to 3,000 Ma and in the 1940s to 4,500±100 Ma, based on measurements of the relative abundance of uranium isotopes by Alfred O. C. Nier. The general method is now known as the Holmes-Houterman model after Fritz Houtermans who published in the same year, 1946.

In 1924 he was appointed to the newly created post of reader in geology at Durham University. Eighteen years later his achievements were recognised, when he became a Fellow of the Royal Society in 1942. In the following year he was appointed to the chair of geology at the University of Edinburgh, following the death of Prof Thomas John Jehu, which post he held until retirement in 1956. In 1944 he published the first edition of his Principles of Physical Geology which became a standard textbook in the UK and elsewhere.

== Continental drift ==
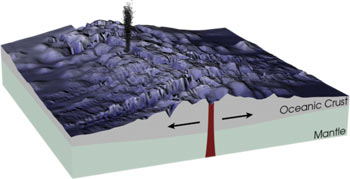
Spreading at a mid-ocean ridge

Holmes championed the theory of continental drift promoted by Alfred Wegener at a time when it was deeply unfashionable with his more conservative peers. One problem with the theory lay in the mechanism of movement, and Holmes proposed that Earth's mantle contained convection cells that dissipated radioactive heat and moved the crust at the surface. His Principles of Physical Geology ended with a chapter on continental drift. Part of the model was the origin of the seafloor spreading concept.

== Honours and awards ==
Honours included:

- 1940 Murchison Medal, Geological Society of London
- 1946 Sederholm Medal, Geological Society of Finland
- 1955 Foreign Member Académie des sciences, Institut de France
- 1956 Penrose Medal, Geological Society of America
- 1956 Wollaston Medal, Geological Society of London
- 1962 Makdougall Brisbane Medal, Royal Society of Edinburgh
- 1964 Vetlesen Prize, Columbia University

The Arthur Holmes Medal of the European Geosciences Union and a crater on Mars have been named in his honour. The Durham University Department of Earth Sciences' Isotope Geology Laboratory is also named after him, as is the students' Geology Society.

== Major works ==
- The age of the earth 1913, Harper & Brothers, 2nd edition 1927, 3rd edition 1937.
- The nomenclature of petrology, with references to selected literature. Thos Murby, London, van Nostrand, New York, 1920, 2nd edition 1928.
- Petrographic methods and calculations with some examples of results achieved Thos Murby, London, 1921 2nd edition 1930.
- Radioactivity and Earth Movements, Trans Geological Soc, Glasgow, vol 18, pp 559–606.
- Principles of Physical Geology 1944, Thomas Nelson & Sons, 2nd edition 1965, 3rd edition (with Doris Holmes) 1978, 4th edition (with Donald Duff) 1993.
- The Phanerozoic time-scale; a symposium dedicated to Professor Arthur Holmes Geological Society, London, 1964.
