= Samuel Warren Carey =

Australian geologist

Samuel Warren Carey AO
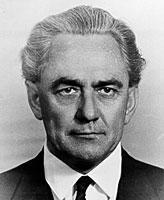
- Born: 1 November 1911; Campbelltown, New South Wales
- Died: 20 March 2002 (aged 90); Hobart, Tasmania
- Education: University of Sydney
- Awards: Clarke Medal (1969); ANZAAS Medal (1998)
- Scientific career
- Workplaces: University of Tasmania (1946–1976)

Samuel Warren Carey AO (1 November 1911 – 20 March 2002) was an Australian geologist and a professor at the University of Tasmania. He was an early advocate of the theory of continental drift. His work on plate tectonics reconstructions led him to develop the Expanding Earth hypothesis.

== Biography ==
Samuel Warren Carey was born in New South Wales and grew up on a farm three miles from Campbelltown. The family was to move to the town centre, saving the young Carey the walk to school. An interest in physics and chemistry during high school was to lead to selection of both subjects when he attended the University of Sydney in 1929. Mathematics was required and he was encouraged to study geology as his fourth subject, a department still under the influence of retired Professor Edgeworth David. He started a student Geology club as he became attracted to the subject's mixture of laboratory and field work; David gave the inaugural speech. Along with classmates Alan Voisey and Dorothy York, he was to earn high distinctions at the university. He also joined the Sydney University Regiment. His Masters and Honours degree were based on four papers on the Werris Creek area. He received his MSc in 1934. It was at this time that Carey read the 1924 translation of Wegener's The Origin of Continents and Oceans, the book largely responsible for introducing the concept of continental drift to English-speaking academics. He was to become a key figure in advancing this concept and plate tectonic models that followed.

Carey was prevented from taking a research scholarship to Cambridge in 1933. Instead, aged 23, he joined Oil Search in the Sepik District of Papua New Guinea where he worked with a team led by G.A.V. Stanley, mapping the surface geology for indications of subsurface oil. The Sepik is where the Australian Tectonic Plate collides with the Pacific Plate and confirmed for Carey, many of his ideas about what is now known as plate tectonics. The work involved long periods in jungle covered hill country, field working from temporary camps, managing carrier lines and dealing with villagers. All supplies were carried in from the bases at Matapau and Aitape on the coast. The mapping involved surveyors drawing base maps at scales of six inches to the mile, using what was then the most up to date geographical techniques (radio time signals and sextants to observe stars) and geologists, including Carey, plotting the geology onto the maps from exposures in the banks of streams. Carey was in the field when a magnitude 6.3 earthquake with an epicentre near Aitape occurred which devastated the inland villages and the tracks over the coastal mountains. He published a paper reporting on the event in The Australian Geographer. After four years in Papua New Guinea, Carey returned to Sydney and wrote and submitted a thesis for a Doctor of Science degree, entitled Tectonic Evolution of New Guinea and Melanesia. The degree was awarded in 1939. He returned to Papua New Guinea and worked there on oil exploration until the outbreak of the Pacific War in 1942. In 1940 he married Austral Robson, with whom he had four children.

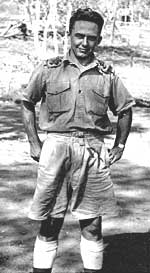
Carey in New Guinea, 1942.

Carey served in World War II as a captain in the special forces unit Z Force, developing a bold plan using small teams in folding kayaks to mine ships in an enemy harbour. This operation (Scorpion) became obsolete but Carey secretly tested his plan by infiltrating Townsville harbour, placing dummy limpet mines on American ships.

After the war, Carey was a highly regarded contributor to geology and his many contributions to the emerging theories and proposals were often in advance of the accepted view. Maps and data produced from his field work in New Guinea were sought after by engineers and fellows. He backed the moving of continents proposed by Alfred Wegener and decided on the expanding Earth idea as the mechanism for this and was the main proponent of this hypothesis. Carey's expanding earth bears many resemblances to the current model, including supercontinents dividing and going adrift, zones of new crust being generated in deep oceanic ridges, and other phenomena of a still active crust. His hypothesis gave the mechanism for this as an expanding earth; whereas the new hypothesis of plate tectonics accounted for it with subduction. However, in principle, there is nothing incompatible between expansion, on a global scale, and subduction, on a local, or, regional scale, as discussed in detail by Andrew Kugler, who described the difference between subduction and overthrusting, which he argued can be discerned based on tectonic mapping, a distinction that is not generally recognised by most geoscientists.

Although the expanding Earth hypothesis is nearly universally rejected by geoscientists, it has been defended recently based on detailed small-earth modeling by Klaus Vogel and James Maxlow and by many others worldwide based on other relevant data.

Despite the eventual acceptance of the plate movement and subduction paradigm over Carey's hypothesis, he is widely regarded as making substantial contributions to the field of tectonics and having considerable influence in the initial acceptance of continental drift over a static model. In 1946, he became the founding professor of geology at the University of Tasmania. He retired from this position 30 years later in 1976.

In the Australia Day Honours list of 1977, Carey was awarded the Officer of the Order of Australia for his services to the field of geology.

He, and a small number of other researchers, continued to support and investigate expanding earth models.

Carey developed his expanding earth model independently of the prior work by Ott Christoph Hilgenberg, who proposed a similar model in his 1933 publication "Vom wachsenden Erdball" ("The Expanding Earth"). Carey only learned of Hilgenberg's work in 1956.

== Legacy ==
The Geological Society of Australia's S. W. Carey Medal, for work in the field of tectonics (sensu lato), has been awarded at the biennial Australian Geological Convention since 1992.

== Publications ==
Books
The Expanding Earth, 448 pp., Elsevier, Amsterdam 1976
Theories of the Earth and Universe, 413 pp., Stanford University Press. 1988
Earth Universe Cosmos - University of Tasmania. 1996

Essays
1958: The tectonic approach to continental drift. In: S. W. Carey (ed.): Continental Drift – A Symposium. University of Tasmania, Hobart, 177-363 (expanding Earth from p. 311 to p. 349)
1961. Palaeomagnetic evidence relevant to a change in the Earth's radius. Nature 190, pp 36.
1963: The asymmetry of the Earth. Australian Journal of Science 25, pp 369-383 and 479-488.
1970: Australia, New Guinea, and Melanesia in the current revolution in concepts of the evolution of the Earth. Search 1 (5), pp 178-189
1975: The Expanding Earth – an Essay Review. Earth Science Reviews, 11, 105-143.
1986: La Terra in espansione. Laterza, Bari.

Awards
Preceded by Herbert Andrewartha	Clarke Medal; 1969	Succeeded by Gilbert Percy Whitley
