= Donald Duff (geologist) =

Scottish geologist and academic author

Peter McLaren Donald Duff FRSE FGS (1927–1998) was a Scottish geologist and academic author.

== Life ==
Duff was born in Edinburgh the son of the personnel officer to the London & North Eastern Railway. His early life was unsettled due to his father’s frequent job-related relocations. He eventually settled and his first fixed school was Edinburgh High School. A neighbour, Mary Noble FRSE, a plant pathologist, encouraged an interest in plants and agriculture, and on this basis, he entered the University of Edinburgh in 1944. However, he was called up to serve (in the Fleet Air Arm) soon thereafter and not demobbed until 1947. On his return to the University of Edinburgh, he instead decided to study geology, under Professor Arthur Holmes, graduating with a BSc in 1951. Holmes encouraged him to undertake a Ph.D., beginning by remapping Ben Hiant near Ardnamurchan. However, it was hard to surpass the original survey work by James Ernest Richey FRSE and Duff abandoned the project. He did, however, fall in love with Ardnamurchan and bought a house there.

After his doctorate, Duff immediately obtained a post mapping with the British Geological Survey being tasked with mapping the coalfields of Nottinghamshire and Derbyshire.

In 1954 Duff was offered a post as lecturer in economic geology at the University of Edinburgh. He rose to Senior Lecturer and Associate Dean of the Faculty of Science. In 1965 he took a sabbatical to research the coalfields of New South Wales in Australia for the University of Sydney. He left the University of Edinburgh in 1974 to take a post as Professor of Applied Geology at the University of Strathclyde. At the University he was also Dean of the School of Civil Engineering. In 1982 he left academia to take on the role of Chief Coal Review Geologist to BP.

In 1974 Duff was elected a Fellow of the Royal Society of Edinburgh. His proposers were Gordon Y Craig, E Kendall Walton, Sir Frederick H Stewart and Charles Waterston.

In the period 1974 to 1982 Duff used his summer vacations as a consulting geologist in British Columbia. This required worldwide travel in search of fuel supplies. He was a member of the Athenaeum Club, London and the New Club, Edinburgh.

Duff had several health issues including having a disc removed in 1946 which ended his sporting life. He had a sextuple heart bypass in 1985 and retired in 1987. He died of cancer in Edinburgh on 23 March 1998.

== Publications ==
Duff was editor of the Geological Journal and also contributed to the Scottish Journal of Geology and Applied Earth Science. Other works include:

- Cyclic Sedimentation (1967) with E K Walton
- Geology of the Lothians and South East Scotland (1976)
- Geology of England and Wales (1992)

== Family ==
Duff was married to Jean in 1952 and had three children, Peter, Alistair, and Jennifer.
