= Plate Tectonics Revolution =

1912–1967 paradigm shift in geology

The Plate Tectonics Revolution was the scientific and cultural change which developed from the acceptance of the plate tectonics theory. The event was a paradigm shift and scientific revolution.

By 1967 most scientists in geology accepted the theory of plate tectonics. The root of this was Alfred Wegener's 1912 publication of his theory of continental drift, which was a controversy in the field through the 1950s. At that point scientists introduced new evidence in a new way, replacing the idea of continental drift with instead a theory of plate tectonics. The acceptance of this theory brought scientific and cultural change which commentators called the "Plate Tectonics Revolution".

== Response ==
In 1975 a paper said that "plate tectonics" gained general acceptance in its field in 1968 and called that acceptance a revolution.

One scientist said that the Plate Tectonics Revolution brought excitement among scientists in the field in the 1960s.

Publications in generations after the event reflected on how the Plate Tectonics Revolution was an early example of data science.

One commentator claimed that the plate tectonics theory became popular and established a revolution in culture even before scientists could confirm some of the claims for which evidence was lacking.

== List of revolutionaries ==
- Émile Argand
- Alfred Wegener
- Roberto Mantovani
- Arthur Holmes
- Felix Andries Vening Meinesz
- Samuel Warren Carey
- Robert R. Coats
- Edward Bullard
- W. Jason Morgan
- John Tuzo Wilson
- Marie Tharp
- Frank Bursley Taylor
- Victor Conrad
- Andrija Mohorovičić
- Dan McKenzie
