= Antonio Snider-Pellegrini =

French geographer and scientist (1802–1885)

- Born: 1802; Trieste, Austrian Circle, Holy Roman Empire
- Died: 1885 (aged 82–83); New York City, New York, United States of America
- Occupation: Geographer Geologist
- Writing career
- Language: French
- Period: 1858-1862
- Notable work: La Création et ses mystères dévoilés

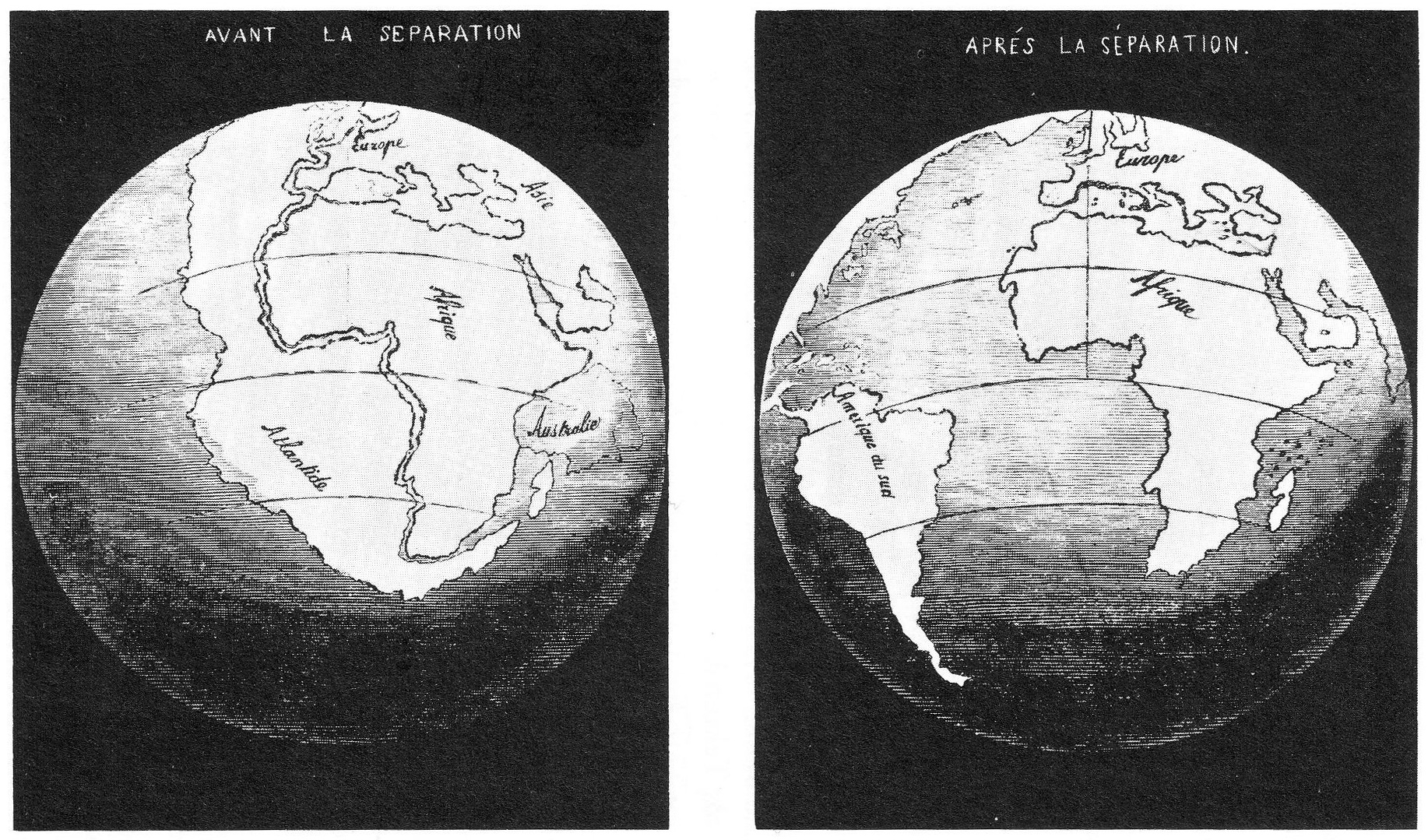
In 1858, Snider-Pellegrini made these two maps. They depict his interpretation of how the American and African continents may once have fit together before becoming separated.

Antonio Snider-Pellegrini (1802–1885) was a French geographer and geologist who theorized about the possibility of continental drift, anticipating Wegener's theories concerning Pangaea by several decades.

In 1858, Snider-Pellegrini published his book, La Création et ses mystères dévoilés ("The Creation and its Mysteries Unveiled"). He proposed that all of the continents were once connected together during the Pennsylvanian Period. He based this theory on the fact that he had found plant fossils in both Europe and the United States that were identical. He found matching fossils on all of the continents.

Also Pellegrini proposed a large change in the Earth's size during the time of the Biblical Genesis flood account at the time of Noah (Genesis 6-8).

He was a follower of Charles Fourier and is also remembered for his attempt to establish a Phalanstèry near Matagorda, Texas.

Pellegrini was preceded by Abraham Ortelius and followed by Eduard Suess, Roberto Mantovani, Frank Bursley Taylor, and Alfred Wegener as early advocates of continental drift.
