= Andesite =

Type of volcanic rock

- Igneous rock
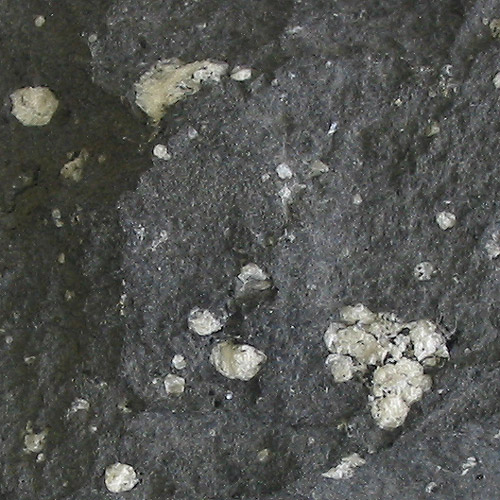
- A sample of andesite (dark groundmass) with amygdaloidal vesicles filled with zeolite. Diameter of view is 8 cm.

Composition
- Classification: Intermediate
- Primary: plagioclase feldspar (often andesine)
- Secondary: Tholeiitic andesite: Clinopyroxene (augite) and othopyroxene (hypersthene), quartz, and volcanic glass. Calc-alkaline andesite: Magnetites, biotite, hornblende, quartz, and volcanic glass

Andesite (/ˈændəzaɪt/) is a volcanic rock of intermediate composition. In a general sense, it is the intermediate type between silica-poor basalt and silica-rich rhyolite. It is fine-grained (aphanitic) to porphyritic in texture, and is composed predominantly of sodium-rich plagioclase plus pyroxene or hornblende.

Andesite is the extrusive equivalent of plutonic diorite. Characteristic of subduction zones, andesite represents the dominant rock type in island arcs. The average composition of the continental crust is andesitic. Along with basalts, andesites are a component of the Martian crust.

The name andesite is derived from the Andes mountain range, where this rock type is found in abundance. It was first applied by Christian Leopold von Buch in 1826.

== Description ==
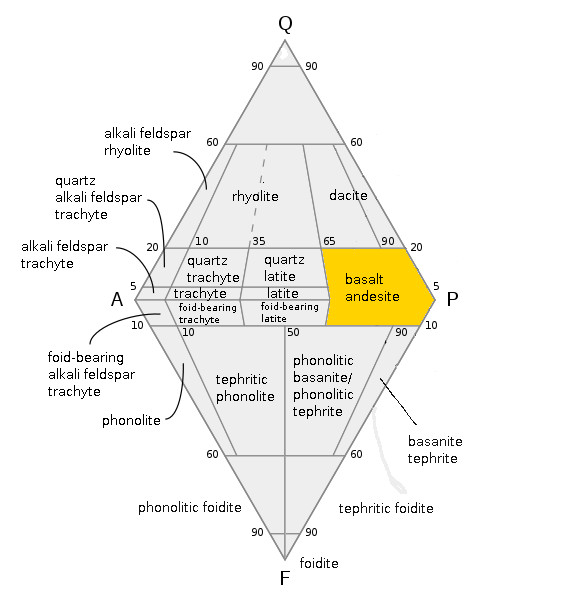
QAPF diagram with basalt/andesite field highlighted in yellow. Andesite is distinguished from basalt by SiO_{2} > 52%.

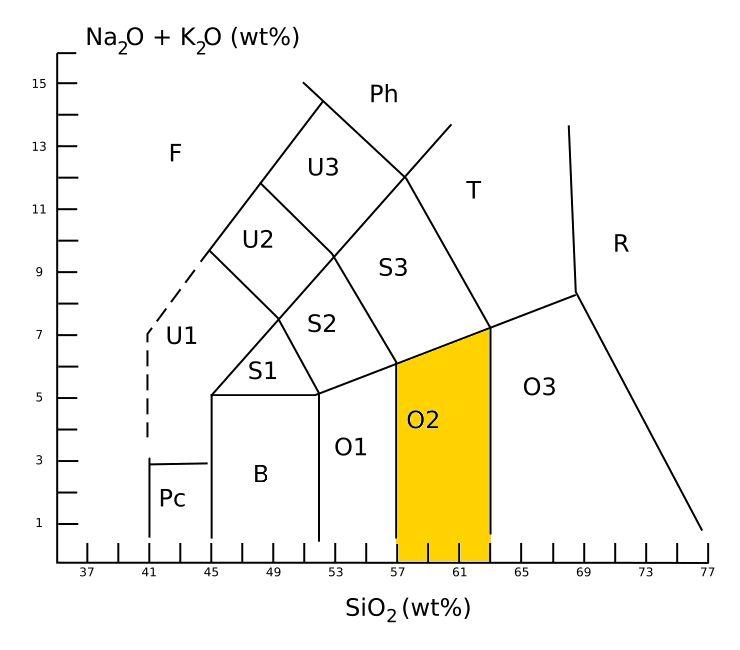
Andesite is field O2 in the TAS classification.

Andesite is an aphanitic (fine-grained) to porphyritic (coarse-grained) igneous rock that is intermediate in its content of silica and low in alkali metals. It has less than 20% quartz and 10% feldspathoid by volume, with at least 65% of the feldspar in the rock consisting of plagioclase. This places andesite in the basalt/andesite field of the QAPF diagram. Andesite is further distinguished from basalt by its silica content of over 52%. However, it is often not possible to determine the mineral composition of volcanic rocks, due to their very fine grain size, and andesite is then defined chemically as volcanic rock with a content of 57% to 63% silica and not more than about 6% alkali metal oxides. This places the andesite in the O2 field of the TAS classification. Basaltic andesite, with a content of 52% to 57% silica, is represented by the O1 field of the TAS classification but is not a distinct rock type in the QAPF classification.

Andesite is usually light to dark grey in colour, due to its content of hornblende or pyroxene minerals, but can exhibit a wide range of shading. Darker andesite can be challenging to distinguish from basalt, but a common rule of thumb, used away from the laboratory, is that andesite has a colour index less than 35.

The plagioclase in andesite varies widely in sodium content, from anorthite to oligoclase, but is typically andesine, in which anorthite makes up about 40 mol% of the plagioclase. The pyroxene minerals that may be present include augite, pigeonite, or orthopyroxene. Magnetite, zircon, apatite, ilmenite, biotite, and garnet are common accessory minerals. Alkali feldspar may be present in minor amounts.

Andesite is usually porphyritic, containing larger crystals (phenocrysts) of plagioclase formed prior to the extrusion that brought the magma to the surface, embedded in a finer-grained matrix. Phenocrysts of pyroxene or hornblende are also common. These minerals have the highest melting temperatures of the typical minerals that can crystallize from the melt and are therefore the first to form solid crystals. Classification of andesites may be refined according to the most abundant phenocryst. For example, if hornblende is the principal phenocryst mineral, the andesite will be described as a hornblende andesite.

== Andesitic volcanism ==
Andesite lava typically has a viscosity of 3.5 million cP (3500 Pa⋅s) at 1,200 °C (2,190 °F). This is slightly greater than the viscosity of smooth peanut butter. As a result, andesitic volcanism is often explosive, forming tuffs and agglomerates. Andesite vents tend to build up composite volcanoes rather than the shield volcanoes characteristic of basalt, with its much lower viscosity resulting from its lower silica content and higher eruption temperature.

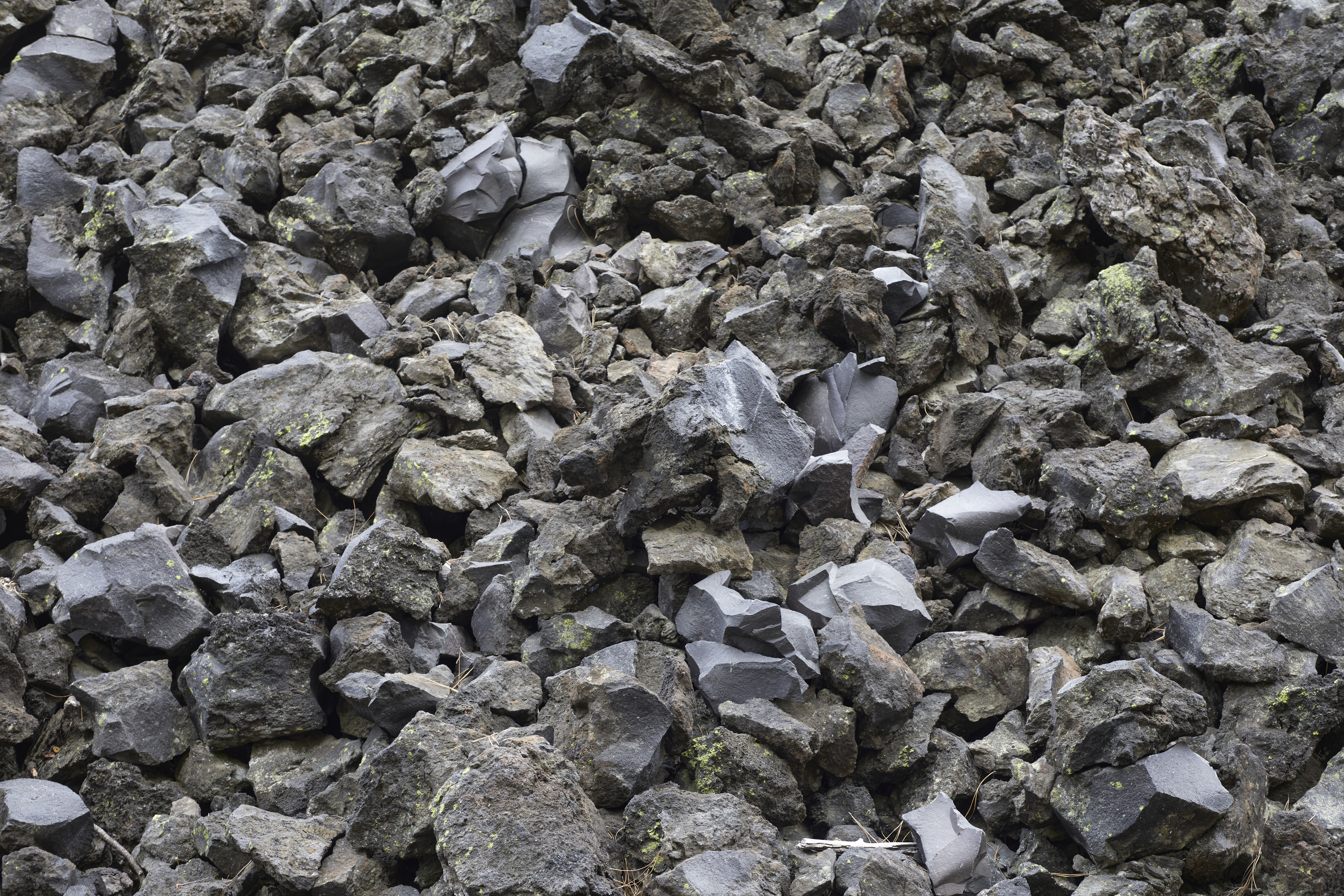
Block lava at Fantastic Lava Beds near Cinder Cone in Lassen Volcanic National Park

Block lava flows are typical of andesitic lavas from composite volcanoes. They behave in a similar manner to ʻaʻā flows but their more viscous nature causes the surface to be covered in smooth-sided angular fragments (blocks) of solidified lava instead of clinkers. As with ʻaʻā flows, the molten interior of the flow, which is kept insulated by the solidified blocky surface, advances over the rubble that falls off the flow front. They also move much more slowly downhill and are thicker in depth than ʻaʻā flows.

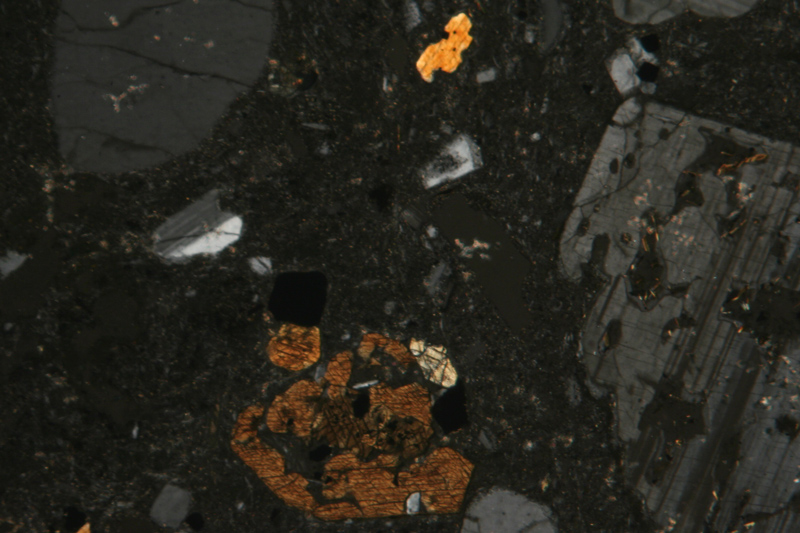
Photomicrograph of andesite in thin section (between crossed polarizers)

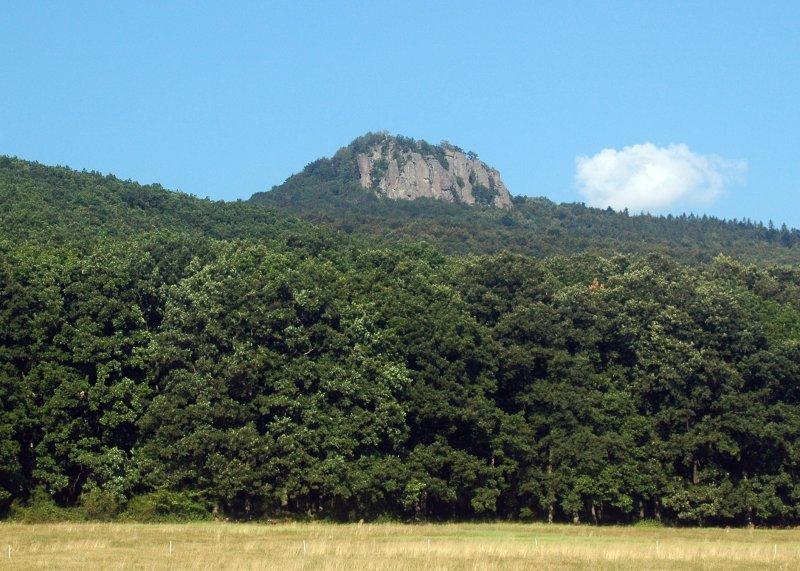
Andesite Mount Žarnov (Vtáčnik), Slovakia

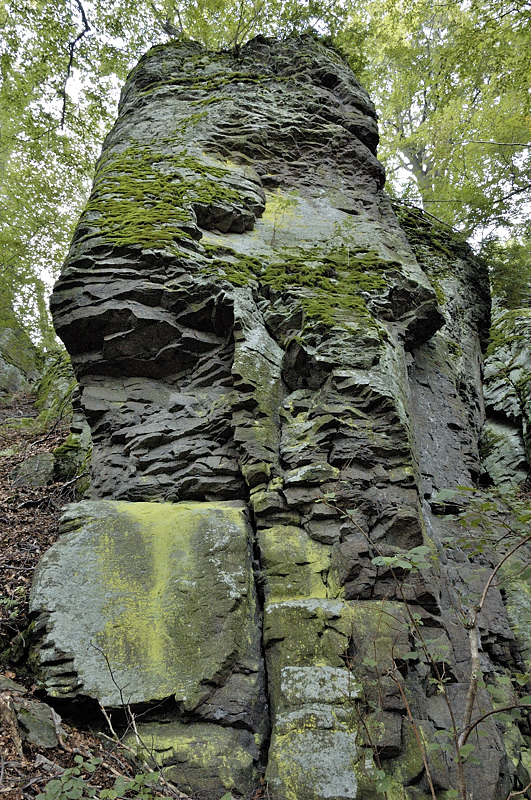
Andesite pillar in Slovakia

== Generation of melts in island arcs ==
Though andesite is common in other tectonic settings, it is particularly characteristic of convergent plate margins. Even before the Plate Tectonics Revolution, geologists had defined an andesite line in the western Pacific that separated basalt of the central Pacific from andesite further west. This coincides with the subduction zones at the western boundary of the Pacific Plate. Magmatism in island arc regions comes from the interplay of the subducting plate and the mantle wedge, the wedge-shaped region between the subducting and overriding plates. The presence of convergent margins dominated by andesite is so characteristic of the Earth's unique plate tectonics that the Earth has been described as an "andesite planet".

During subduction, the subducted oceanic crust is subjected to increasing pressure and temperature, leading to metamorphism. Hydrous minerals such as amphibole, zeolites, or chlorite (which are present in the oceanic lithosphere) dehydrate as they change to more stable, anhydrous forms, releasing water and soluble elements into the overlying wedge of mantle. Fluxing water into the wedge lowers the solidus of the mantle material and causes partial melting. Due to the lower density of the partially molten material, it rises through the wedge until it reaches the lower boundary of the overriding plate. Melts generated in the mantle wedge are of basaltic composition, but they have a distinctive enrichment of soluble elements (e.g. potassium (K), barium (Ba), and lead (Pb)) which are contributed from sediment that lies at the top of the subducting plate. Although there is evidence to suggest that the subducting oceanic crust may also melt during this process, the relative contribution of the three components (crust, sediment, and wedge) to the generated basalts is still a matter of debate.

Basalt thus formed can contribute to the formation of andesite through fractional crystallization, partial melting of crust, or magma mixing, all of which are discussed next.

== Genesis ==
Intermediate volcanic rocks are created via several processes:

- Fractional crystallization of a mafic parent magma.
- Partial melting of crustal material.
- Magma mixing between felsic rhyolitic and mafic basaltic magmas in a magma reservoir
- Partial melting of metasomatized mantle

=== Fractional crystallization ===
To achieve andesitic composition via fractional crystallization, a basaltic magma must crystallize specific minerals that are then removed from the melt. This removal can take place in a variety of ways, but most commonly this occurs by crystal settling. The first minerals to crystallize and be removed from a basaltic parent are olivines and amphiboles. These mafic minerals settle out of the magma, forming mafic cumulates. There is geophysical evidence from several arcs that large layers of mafic cumulates lie at the base of the crust. Once these mafic minerals have been removed, the melt no longer has a basaltic composition. The silica content of the residual melt is enriched relative to the starting composition. The iron and magnesium contents are depleted. As this process continues, the melt becomes more and more evolved eventually becoming andesitic. Without continued addition of mafic material, however, the melt will eventually reach a rhyolitic composition. This produces the characteristic basalt-andesite-rhyolite association of island arcs, with andesite the most distinctive rock type.

=== Partial melting of the crust ===
Partially molten basalt in the mantle wedge moves upwards until it reaches the base of the overriding crust. Once there, the basaltic melt can either underplate the crust, creating a layer of molten material at its base, or it can move into the overriding plate in the form of dykes. If it underplates the crust, the basalt can (in theory) cause partial melting of the lower crust due to the transfer of heat and volatiles. Models of heat transfer, however, show that arc basalts emplaced at temperatures 1100–1240 °C cannot provide enough heat to melt lower crustal amphibolite. Basalt can, however, melt pelitic upper crustal material.

=== Magma mixing ===
In continental arcs, such as the Andes, magma often pools in the shallow crust creating magma chambers. Magmas in these reservoirs become evolved in composition (dacitic to rhyolitic) through both the process of fractional crystallization and partial melting of the surrounding country rock. Over time as crystallization continues and the system loses heat, these reservoirs cool. In order to remain active, magma chambers must have continued recharge of hot basaltic melt into the system. When this basaltic material mixes with the evolved rhyolitic magma, the composition is returned to andesite, its intermediate phase. Evidence of magma mixing is provided by the presence of phenocrysts in some andesites that are not in chemical equilibrium with the melt in which they are found.

=== Partial melting of metasomatized mantle ===
High-magnesium andesites (boninites) in island arcs may be primitive andesites, generated from metasomatized mantle. Experimental evidence shows that depleted mantle rock exposed to alkali fluids such as might be given off by a subducting slab generates magma resembling high-magnesium andesites.

== Notable andesite structures ==
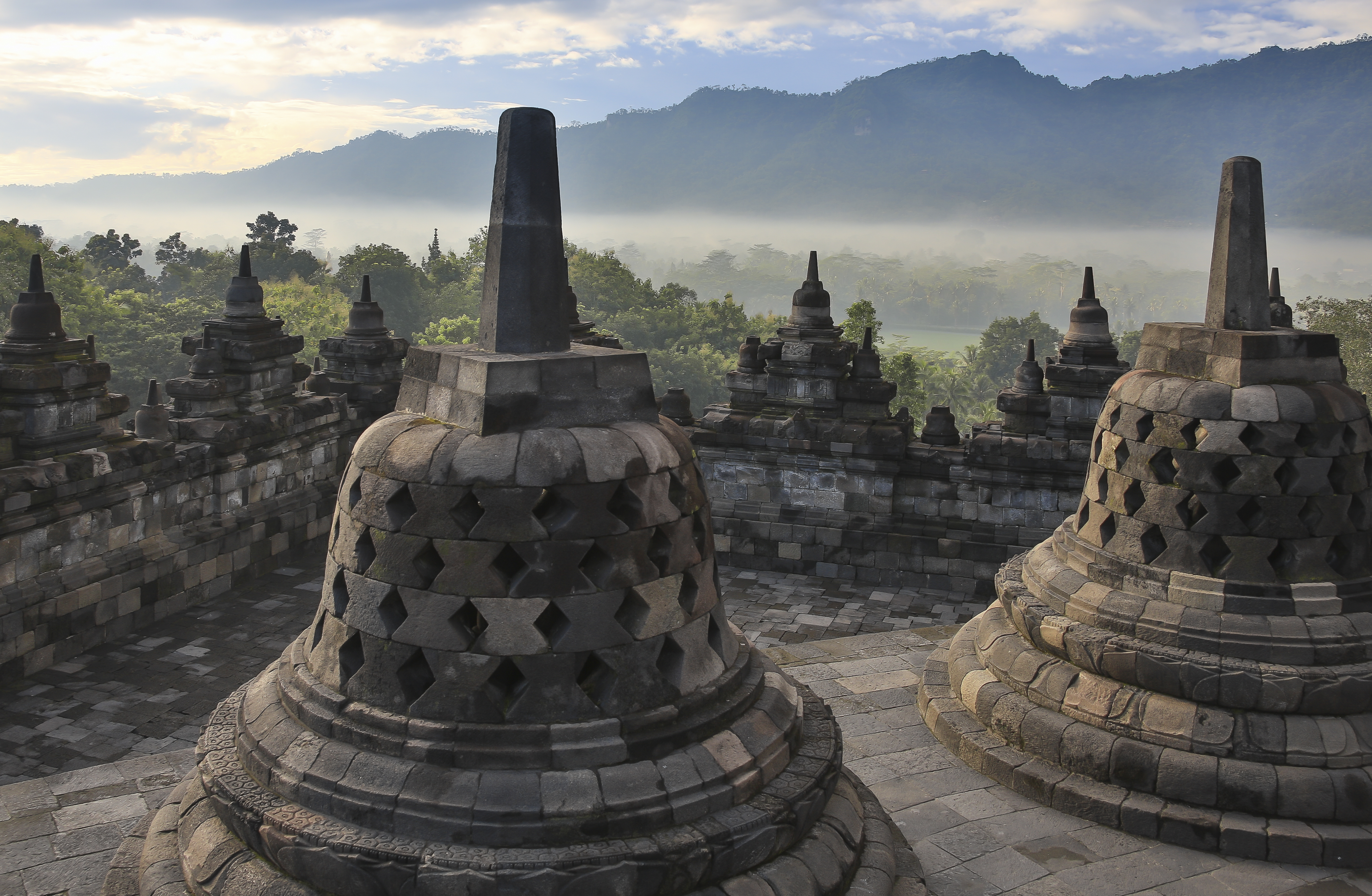
Andesite stupas at Borobudur temple, Indonesia

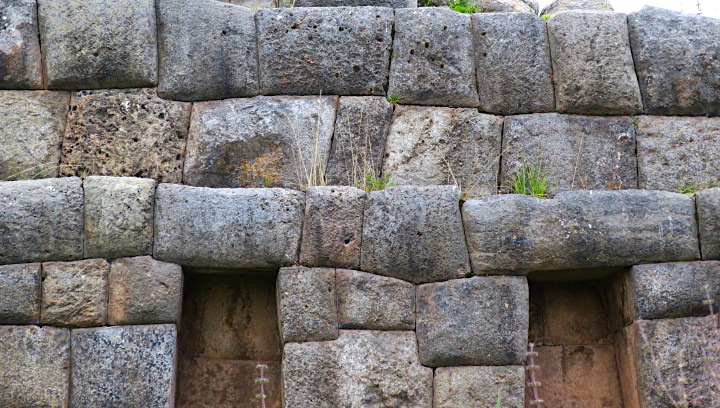
Andesite retaining wall at Sacsayhuamán citadel, Peru

Notable stonemasonry structures built with andesite include:

- Borobudur in Java, Indonesia
- Sacsayhuamán citadel in Peru
- Gate of the Sun in Bolivia
- Templo Mayor ruins and other historic buildings in Mexico City, built from andesite and Tezontle basaltic andesite

== Extraterrestrial samples ==
In 2009, researchers revealed that andesite was found in two meteorites (numbered GRA 06128 and GRA 06129) that were discovered in the Graves Nunataks icefield during the US Antarctic Search for Meteorites 2006/2007 field season. This possibly points to a new mechanism to generate andesite crust.

Along with basalts, andesites are a component of the Martian crust. The presence of distinctive steep-sided domes on Venus suggests that andesite may have been erupted from large magma chambers where crystal settling could take place.

== See also ==
- List of rock types
- Metamorphism – Change of minerals in pre-existing rocks without melting into liquid magma
- Oceanic crust – Uppermost layer of the oceanic portion of a tectonic plate
- Origins of granite – Type of igneous rock
- Porphyry – Textural form of igneous rock with large grained crystals in a fine matrix
