= Epstein drag =

Equation for the drag on a sphere in high Knudsen-number flow

In fluid dynamics, Epstein drag is a theoretical result, for the drag force exerted on spheres in high Knudsen number flow (i.e., rarefied gas flow). This may apply, for example, to sub-micron droplets in air, or to larger spherical objects moving in gases more rarefied than air at standard temperature and pressure. Note that while they may be small by some criteria, the spheres must nevertheless be much more massive than the species (molecules, atoms) in the gas that are colliding with the sphere, in order for Epstein drag to apply. The reason for this is to ensure that the change in the sphere's momentum due to individual collisions with gas species is not large enough to substantially alter the sphere's motion, such as occurs in Brownian motion.

The result was obtained by Paul Sophus Epstein in 1924. His result was used for high-precision measurements of the charge on the electron in the oil drop experiment performed by Robert A. Millikan, as cited by Millikan in his 1930 review paper on the subject. For the early work on that experiment, the drag was assumed to follow Stokes' law. However, for droplets substantially below the submicron scale, the drag approaches Epstein drag instead of Stokes drag, since the mean free path of air species (atoms and molecules) is roughly of order of a tenth of a micron.

== Statement of the law ==
The magnitude of the force on a sphere moving through a rarefied gas, in which the diameter of the sphere is of order or less than the collisional mean free path in the gas, is

$$F = \delta \frac{4 \pi}{3} a^2 n m \bar c u$$

where $a$ is the radius of the spherical particle, $n$ is the number density of gas species, $m$ is their mass, ${\bar c}$ is the arithmetic mean speed of gas species, and $u$ is the relative speed of the sphere with respect to the rest frame of the gas. The factor $\delta$ encompasses the microphysics of the gas-sphere interaction and the resultant distribution of velocities of the reflected particles, which is not a trivial problem. It is not uncommon to assume $\delta = 1$ (see below) presumably in part because empirically $\delta$ is found to be close to 1 numerically, and in part because in many applications, the uncertainty due to $\delta$ is dwarfed by other uncertainties in the problem. For this reason, one sometimes encounters Epstein drag written with the factor $\delta$ left absent. The force acts in a direction opposite to the direction of motion of the sphere. Forces acting normal to the direction of motion are known as "lift", not "drag", and in any case are not present in the stated problem when the sphere is not rotating.

For mixtures of gases (e.g. air), the total force is simply the sum of the forces due to each component of the gas, noting with care that each component (species) will have a different $n$, a different $m$ and a different ${\bar c}$. Note that $n m = \rho$ where $\rho$ is the gas density, noting again, with care, that in the case of multiple species, there are multiple different such densities contributing to the overall force.

The net force is due both to momentum transfer to the sphere due to species impinging on it, and momentum transfer due to species leaving, due either to reflection, evaporation, or some combination of the two. Additionally, the force due to reflection depends upon whether the reflection is purely specular or, by contrast, partly or fully diffuse, and the force also depends upon whether the reflection is purely elastic, or inelastic, or some other assumption regarding the velocity distribution of reflecting particles, since the particles are, after all, in thermal contact - albeit briefly - with the surface. All of these effects are combined in Epstein's work in an overall prefactor "$\delta$". Theoretically, $\delta=1$ for purely elastic specular reflection, but may be less than or greater than unity in other circumstances. For reference, note that kinetic theory gives
$$\bar c = \sqrt{\frac {8}{\pi} \cdot \frac{k_\mathrm{B} T}{m}}.$$
For the specific cases considered by Epstein, $\delta$ ranges from a minimum value of 1 up to a maximum value of 1.444. For example, Epstein predicts $\delta=1+\pi/8\simeq 1.39$ for diffuse elastic collisions. One may sometimes encounter
$$\delta = 1+ \alpha \frac{\pi}{8}$$
where $\alpha$ is the accommodation coefficient, which appears in the Maxwell model for the interaction of gas species with surfaces, characterizing the fraction of reflection events that are diffuse (as opposed to specular). (There are other accommodation coefficients that describe thermal energy transfer as well, but are beyond the scope of this article.)

In-line with theory, an empirical measurement, for example, for melamine-formaldehyde spheres in argon gas, gives $\delta=1.26\pm0.13$ as measured by one method, and $\delta=1.44\pm0.19$ by another method, as reported by the same authors in the same paper. According to Epstein himself, Millikan found $\delta=1.154$ for oil drops, whereas Knudsen found $\delta=1.164$ for glass spheres.

In his paper, Epstein also considered modifications to allow for nontrivial ${\rm Kn}^{-1}$. That is, he treated the leading terms in what happens if the flow is not fully in the rarefied regime. Also, he considered the effects due to rotation of the sphere. Normally, by "Epstein drag," one does not include such effects.

As noted by Epstein himself, previous work on this problem had been performed by Langevin by Cunningham, and by Lenard. These previous results were in error, however, as shown by Epstein; as such, Epstein's work is viewed as definitive, and the result goes by his name.

== Applications ==
As mentioned above, the original practical application of Epstein drag was to refined estimates of the charge on the electron in the Millikan oil-drop experiment. Several substantive practical applications have ensued.

One application among many in astrophysics is the problem of gas-dust coupling in protostellar disks. See also section 4.1.1, "Epstein drag," page 110-111 of.

Another application is the drag on stellar dust in red giant atmospheres, which counteracts the acceleration due to radiation pressure

Another application is to dusty plasmas.
