= Dorsa Argand =

Wrinkle ridge system on the Moon

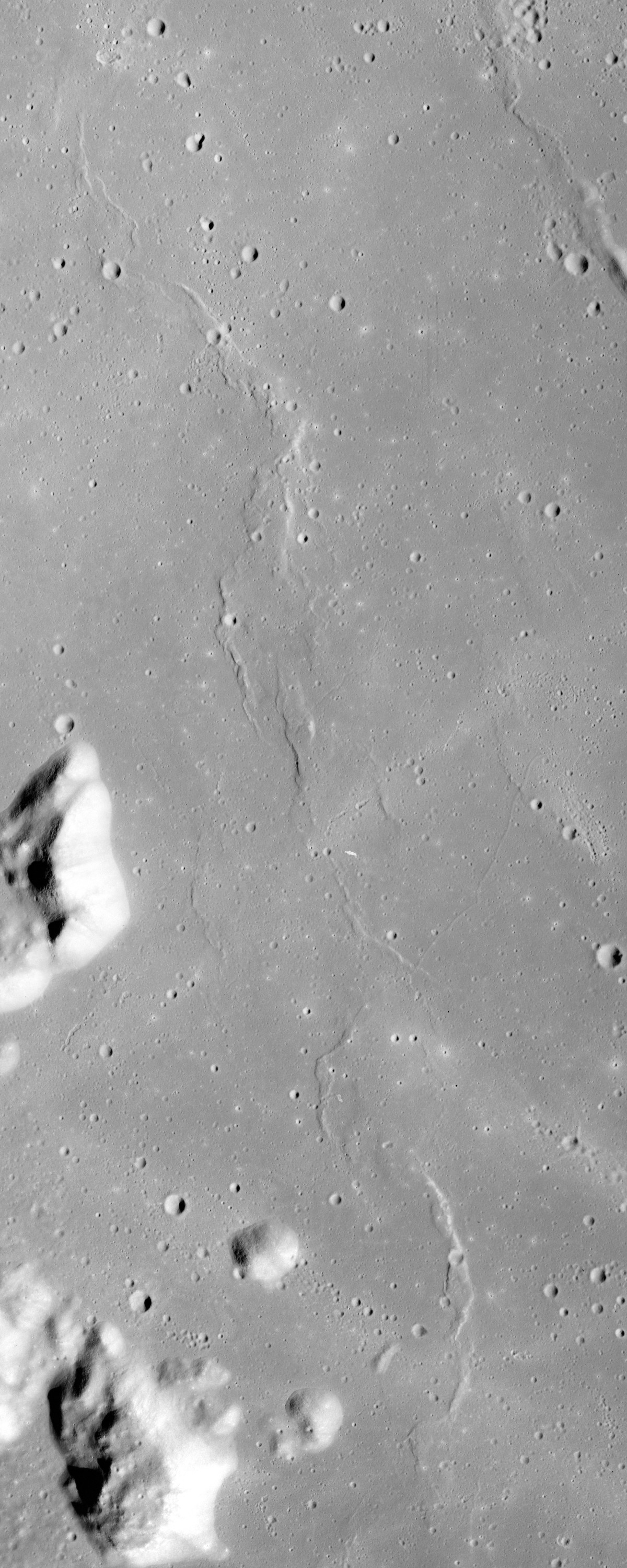
The southern part of Dorsa Argand

Dorsa Argand is a wrinkle ridge system at 28.1°N 40.6°W on the Moon, in Oceanus Procellarum near the border with Mare Imbrium. It is approximately 92 km long and was named after Swiss geologist Émile Argand in 1976. The name of the feature was approved by the IAU in 1976.
