= Polflucht =

Geophysical concept

Polflucht (from German, flight from the poles) is a geophysical concept invoked in 1922 by Alfred Wegener to explain his ideas of continental drift.

The pole-flight force $F_\mathrm{Pf}$ is that component of the centrifugal force during the rotation of the Earth that acts tangentially to the Earth's surface.

The daily rotation of the Earth (more precisely: within a sidereal day of 23.93447 hours) around its axis of rotation causes everybody on Earth to experience a centrifugal force that points away perpendicularly from the Earth's axis, i.e. diagonally to the Earth's surface, depending on the degree of latitude. The centrifugal force contains a component tangential to the surface of the Earth away from the pole; this component is called the Polfluchtkraft, or pole-flight force.

== Mathematics ==
The magnitude of the centrifugal force is:

$$F_\mathrm{Cf} = m \cdot \omega^2 \cdot r$$

where

- $m$ is the mass of the body (not the Earth's mass!)
- $r$ is its distance from the Earth's axis
- $\omega = 0.00007292116 / \mathrm{s}$ is the angular velocity of the Earth's rotation in radians per second

The distance depends on the geographical latitude φ over a mean Earth radius R = 6371 km, resulting in:

$$\Rightarrow F_\mathrm{Cf} = m \cdot \omega^2 \cdot R \cdot \cos \varphi$$

Only at the equator does the centrifugal force exactly counteract the gravitational force. At all other degrees of latitude it acts at an angle α = 90° – φ to the horizontal.

The following now applies to the pole-flight force:

$$\begin{align}
F_\mathrm{Pf} & = F_\mathrm{Cf} \cdot \sin \varphi\\
& = m \cdot \omega^2 \cdot R \cdot \cos \varphi \cdot \sin \varphi
\end{align}$$

== Effect ==
If one considers only that component of the force which acts parallel to the Earth's surface, then it is directed to the south in the Northern Hemisphere and to the north in the Southern Hemisphere. The constant action of this force is why the Earth is not a perfect sphere but is flattened at the poles. The somewhat elastic nature of the Earth adjusts to the prevailing rotation, so that its mass distribution yields to the polar-flight force and the equatorial radius increases at the expense of the polar radius. Today the flattening of the poles is 0.3353%, or 21 km.

Isaac Newton formulated this deformation mathematically for the first time. The resulting Polfluchtkraft was postulated by the German geologist Damian Kreichgauer in 1902 and the Hungarian physicist Loránd Eötvös in 1912. Around 1920 Alfred Wegener postulated the pole flight of the continents and suspected that the centrifugal force was the cause of continental drift hypothesized by him and others. This was refuted a few years later, but the terms Polflucht and Polfluchtkraft found their way into the scientific literature.

Wegener suggested that the differential gravitational force resulting from the horizontal component of the centrifugal could cause continental masses to drift slowly towards the equator.

Wegener's hypothesis was expanded by Paul Sophus Epstein in 1920, but the force is now known to be far too weak to cause plate tectonics. The strength of the layers of the Earth's crust is much stronger than assumed by Wegener and Epstein.

== Literature ==
- The Concise Oxford Dictionary of Earth Sciences (topic 'Polflucht'), Oxford 1990
- Laszlo Egyed: Physik der festen Erde (Physics of solid Earth), 368p. Akadémiai Kiadó, Budapest 1969
- Nölke, F. (1921). "Über die Polflucht der Kontinente". metapress.com. Archived from the original on July 14, 2011.
- Damian Kreichgauer, Die Äquatorfrage in der Geologie, Missionsdruckerei in Steyl, Steyl (1902)
- Loránd Eötvös, Verhandlungen der 17. Allgemeinen Conferenz der Internationalen Erdmessung, Volume 1, Georg Reimer, Berlin (1913)
- Alfred Wegener, Die Entstehung der Kontinente und Ozeane, Second Edition, Friedrich Vieweg & Sohn, Braunschweig (1920)
- Alfred Wegener, The Origin of Continents and Oceans, Translated from the Third German Edition by John George Anthony Skerl, E P Dutton and Company, New York (1924)
