= Andesite line =

The andesite line is the most significant regional geologic distinction in the Pacific Ocean basin. It separates the mafic basaltic volcanic rocks of the Central Pacific Basin from the partially submerged continental areas of more felsic andesitic volcanic rock on its margins. The andesite line parallels the subduction zones and deep oceanic trenches around the Pacific basin. It is the surface expression of melting within and above the plunging subducting slab. It follows the western edge of the islands off California and passes south of the Aleutian Arc, along the eastern edge of the Kamchatka Peninsula, the Kuril Islands, Japan, the Mariana Islands, Yap, Palau, the Solomon Islands, Fiji, Tonga, and New Zealand's North Island. The dissimilarity continues northeastward along the western edge of the Andes mountains of South America to Mexico, returning then to the islands off California. Indonesia, the Philippines, Japan, New Guinea, and New Zealand lie outside the andesite line.

Within the closed loop of the andesite line are most of the deep troughs, submerged volcanic mountains, and oceanic volcanic islands that characterize the Pacific basin. It is here that basaltic lavas gently flow out of rifts to build huge dome-shaped volcanic mountains whose eroded summits form island arcs, chains, and clusters. Outside the andesite line, volcanism is of the explosive type. The Pacific Ring of Fire runs parallel to the line and is the world's foremost belt of explosive volcanism.

The term andesite line predates the geologic understanding of plate tectonics. The term was first used in 1912 by New Zealand geologist Patrick Marshall to describe the distinct structural and volcanologic boundary extending from east of New Zealand to Fiji and north of the New Hebrides and the Solomon Islands.

== See also ==
- Pacific Plate
