= Paul Sophus Epstein =

Russian-American physicist (1883–1966)

- Павел Зигмундович Эпштейн
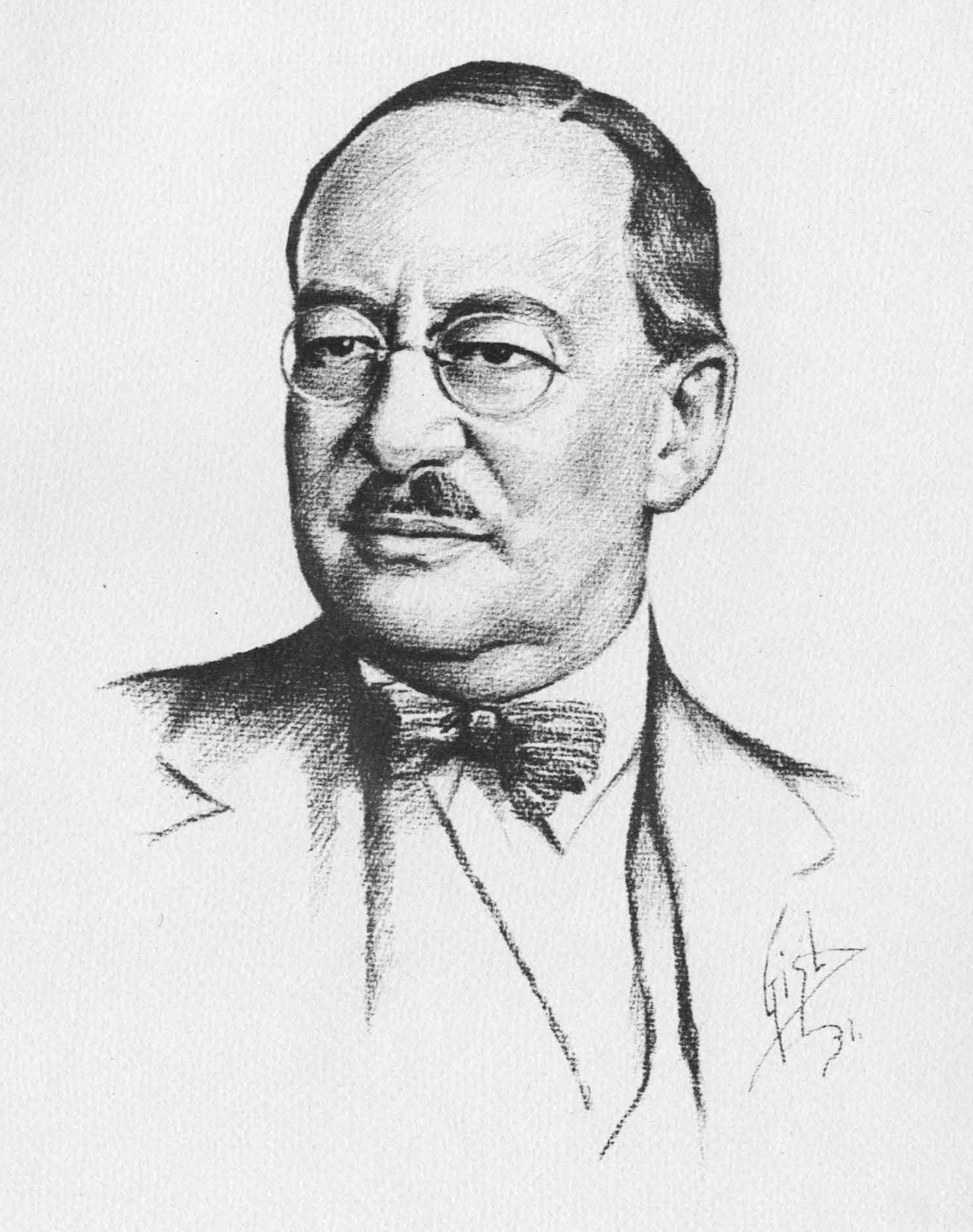
- Epstein by Carl Gist, 1931
- Born: March 20, 1883; Warsaw, Vistula Land, Russian Empire
- Died: February 8, 1966 (aged 82); Pasadena, California, United States
- Education: Imperial University of Moscow; Technical University of Munich
- Known for: Epstein drag Epstein profile Quantum theory of the Stark effect
- Children: 1 daughter
- Scientific career
- Fields: Quantum mechanics Fluid dynamics
- Workplaces: California Institute of Technology
- Thesis: Beugung an einem ebenen Schirm (1914)
- Doctoral advisor: Arnold Sommerfeld
- Doctoral students: Robert B. Leighton

Paul Sophus Epstein (Russian: Павел Зигмундович Эпштейн, romanized: Pavel Zigmundovich Epshteyn; March 20, 1883 – February 8, 1966) was a Russian-American mathematical physicist. He was known for his contributions to fluid dynamics and to the development of quantum mechanics.

== Early life and studies ==
Paul Epstein's parents, Siegmund Simon Epstein and Sarah Sophia (Lurie) Epstein were of a middle class Jewish family. He said that his mother recognized his potential at the age of four years and predicted that he would be a mathematician.

He went to the Hochschule in Minsk, and from 1901 to 1905 studied mathematics and physics at the Imperial University of Moscow under Pyotr Nikolaevich Lebedev. In 1909, he graduated, and became a Privatdozent at the University of Moscow. In 1910, he went to Munich, Germany, to do research under Arnold Sommerfeld, who was his advisor, and Epstein was granted a Ph.D. on a problem in the theory of diffraction of electromagnetic waves. from the Technical University of Munich, in 1914.

== Career ==
At the outbreak of World War I he was in Munich, and considered an enemy alien. Thanks to Sommerfeld's intervention he was allowed to stay in Munich as a private citizen, and could continue with his research. By that time Epstein became interested in the quantum theory of atomic structure. In 1916, he published a seminal paper explaining the Stark effect using the Bohr–Sommerfeld quantization from old quantum theory. After the war he went to Zurich, where he remained for two years. He moved to Leiden in 1921, to become Hendrik Lorentz' and Paul Ehrenfest's assistant. Shortly afterwards he was recruited by Robert Millikan to come to the California Institute of Technology (Caltech), where he remained for the rest of his career.

In 1930, he was elected a member of the National Academy of Sciences. After World War II, concerned that some young American intellectuals were becoming attracted to communism, he joined the American Committee for Cultural Freedom and in 1951 he served as one of the three US delegates to the seminar the Congress held in Strasbourg.

He retired as emeritus professor at Caltech in 1953 and continued to serve as a consultant for a number of industrial companies. The Epstein Memorial Fund was established through donations from more than fifty of his former students and a bronze bust of Epstein stands in the Physics and Mathematics section of the Millikan library at Caltech.

== Research ==
=== Quantum mechanics ===
In 1922, he published 3 papers, on the explanations of the Stark effect, Zeeman effect and magnetic dipoles using Bohr's quantum theory.

=== Air and fluid drag ===
As well as quantum theory, Epstein also published papers in other fields. He worked on were the settling of gases in the atmosphere, the theory of vibrations of shells and plates and the absorption of sound in fogs and suspensions.

Epstein calculated in 1924 the drag on a sphere moving in a gas in the rarefied (i.e., high, or at least not small, Knudsen number) flow regime. This calculation was an important ingredient in improved measurements of the charge of the electron in the Millikan's oil drop experiment, as cited and described as "masterly" by Millikan himself in his review paper of 1930. Epstein's important result is now known as Epstein drag in honor of his work.

=== Continental drift ===
Epstein calculated the effect of Polflucht in 1920 as a possible causing force of Alfred Wegener's continental drift. His value was about 10^{−6} of the gravitational force. Some years later other geophysicists could show that the Polflucht force is far too weak to cause plate tectonics. The toughness of the sublayers of the Earth's crust is much stronger than assumed by Epstein.

=== Reflection by conducting/absorbing layers ===
In 1930, in two papers in PNAS Epstein addressed reflection of radio waves by conducting layers. Results are also applicable to underwater acoustics, where they gave rise to the notion of an Epstein profile or Epstein layer.

== See also ==
- Stark effect
