= Émile Argand =

Swiss geologist (1879–1940)

Émile Argand (6 January 1879 – 14 September 1940) was a Swiss geologist. He founded the Geological Institute of Neuchâtel, Switzerland. Argand is known for his study of the Alps, and was an early proponent of Alfred Wegener's theory of continental drift. Argand published a tectonic map of Asia, for which he was awarded the Spendiarov Prize. He also won the Marcel Benoist Prize. A road, a region on the moon and a series of conferences in Europe are named after him, and the International Union of Geological Sciences' highest award is named the Emile Argand Medal.

== Life ==
Argand was born in Les Eaux-Vives near Geneva. His father was a government clerk, and his mother was from Savoy. He attended vocational school in Geneva, apprenticed to an architect, then worked as a draftsman. His mother encouraged him to study medicine instead. Argand studied anatomy in Paris, but gave up medicine to pursue his interest in geology.

Argand studied under Josef Blaas, the professor of geology and paleontology, at Innsbruck in 1901, and also under Maurice Lugeon in Lausanne. By 1911 he had succeeded Hans Schardt as professor at Neuchâtel.

Argand was an early proponent of Alfred Wegener's theory of continental drift, viewing plate tectonics and continental collisions as the best explanation for the formation of the Alps. He is also noted for his application of the theory of tectonics to the continent of Asia, which he published first in 1913 and then in revised form in 1924.

Argand founded the Geological Institute of Neuchâtel, Switzerland.

Argand died suddenly in Neuchâtel, on 14 September 1940.

== Awards ==
- 1913 Spendiarov Prize
- 1926 Marcel Benoist Prize

== Legacy ==
- A region of wrinkle ridges on the Moon was named Dorsa Argand after him.
- There is a road named "Rue Emile-Argand" at the University of Neuchâtel.
- European Geoscience Union runs the Emile Argand Conferences on Alpine Geological Studies
- The International Union of Geological Sciences' highest award is named the Emile Argand Medal

== Bibliography ==
- Argand, E. (1924), "La Tectonique de l'Asie", Extrait du Compte-rendu du XIIIe Congrès géologique international 1922 (Liège), 1(5), pp. 171-372.
- Argand, E. (1916), "Sur l'arc des Alps Occidentales", Eclogae geologicae Helveticae (Lausanne), 14, pp. 145–192.
- Argand, E. (1911), "Les nappes de recouvrement des Alpes Pennines et leur prolongement structuraux", Mat. carte géol. Suisse, N.S., XXXI livr.
- Emile Argand (1909), L'exploration géologique des Alpes pennines centrales, Lausanne: Imprimeries Réunies, OCLC 493327130, OL 25208924M
