= Frank Bursley Taylor =

American geologist (1860 – 1938)

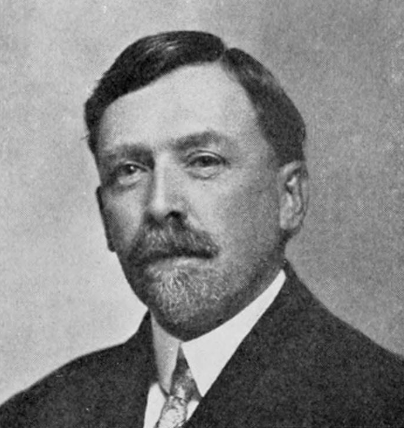
- Taylor in a 1911 publication
- Born: November 23, 1860; Fort Wayne, Indiana
- Died: June 12, 1938 (aged 77); Fort Wayne, Indiana
- Occupation: Geologist
- Spouse: Minnetta Amelia Ketchum (m. 1899)

Signature
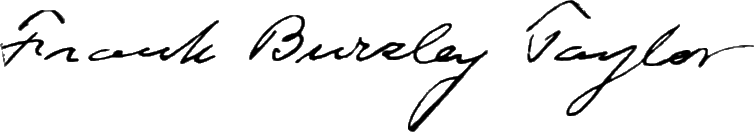

Frank Bursley Taylor (1860–1938) was an American geologist.

== Biography ==
Frank Bursley Taylor was born in Fort Wayne, Indiana on November 23, 1860, the son of a lawyer. He married Minnetta Amelia Ketchum on April 24, 1899.

After dropping out of Harvard, his private studies were financed in large part by his wealthy father. He became a specialist in the glacial geology of the Great Lakes, and proposed to the Geological Society of America on December 29, 1908, that the continents moved on the Earth's surface, that a shallow region in the Atlantic marks where Africa and South America were once joined, and that the collisions of continents could uplift mountains. His ideas were based on his studies on mountain ranges as the Andes, Rockies, Alps and Himalayas, concluding that these mountains could have been formed only as a result of titanic lateral pressures that thrust the earth's surface upward. His theory was either ignored or opposed by other scientists of his time. He wrote a total ten papers on the subject of continental drift. Taylor's ideas about continental drift were independently discovered by Alfred Wegener in Germany three years later, in January 1912, and the theory of continental drift is historically often referred to as the "Taylor-Wegener hypothesis," although Taylor himself disapproved of the hyphenated name. But even with Wegener's extensive extra research the idea did not achieve acceptance until the 1960s when a vast weight of evidence had accrued via Harry Hess, Robert S. Dietz, Frederick Vine and Drummond Matthews.

In a later paper he proposed that this occurred by their being dragged towards the equator by tidal forces during the hypothesized capture of the moon, resulting in "general crustal creep" toward the equator. The initial key to his proposal, the complementary shapes of the continental masses, had been observed as early as the 16th century by Abraham Ortelius, but had lacked a credible driving force. His own proposition was that the moon was captured by the Earth's gravity during the Cretaceous period 100 million years ago, and came so close to the earth that its tidal pull dragged the continents toward the Equator. This lacked evidence, thus undermining the credibility of the continental drift observation. He had proposed that the continents ploughed through the ocean floors towards the equator, wrinkling their Equator-facing fronts to produce the Himalayas and Alps. Although his proposed mechanism was wrong, he was the first to come to the insight that one of the effects of continental motion would be the formation of mountains due to the collision of continental plates.

Taylor died from coronary thrombosis at his home in Fort Wayne on June 12, 1938.
