= Roberto Mantovani =

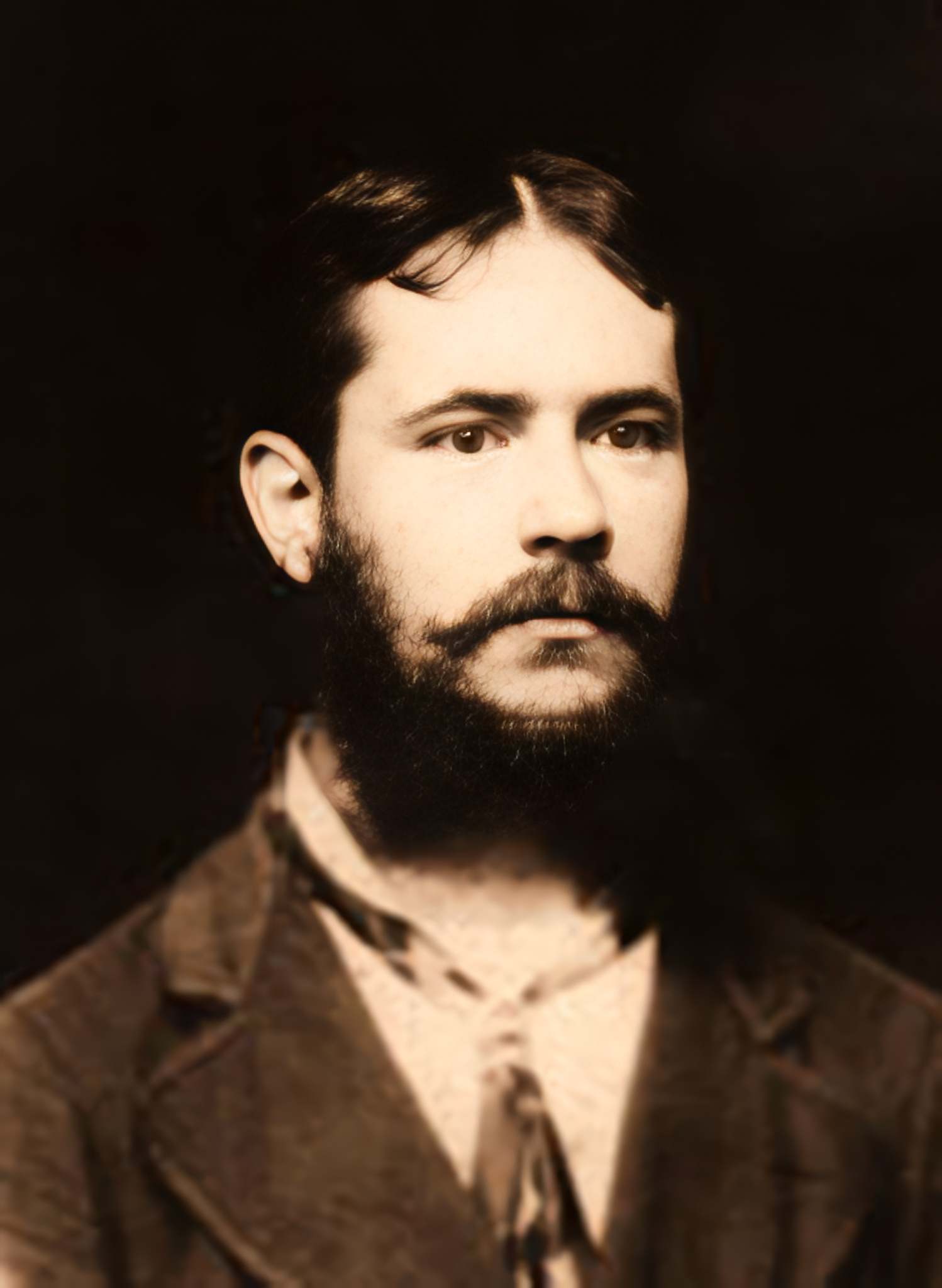
Roberto Mantovani

Roberto Mantovani (25 March 1854 – 10 January 1933), was an Italian geologist and violinist. He proposed an early model of continental drift in which an original single continent was split apart, and the resulting continents were displaced by thermal expansion and volcanism.

Mantovani was born in Parma. His father, Timoteo, died seven months after his birth. His mother, Luigia Ferrari, directed him to studies, and at the age of 11, he was accepted as a boarder in the Royal School of Music, where he was conferred with the Honorary Degree in August 1872. He always preferred the exact sciences and literature to music.

In 1889 and 1909, Mantovani published a hypothesis of an expanding earth and continental drift. He assumed that a closed continent originally covered the entire surface of a smaller earth. By volcanic activity because of thermal expansion, this continent broke apart, so that new continents formed and drifted away from each other because of further expansion of the rip-zones, where now the oceans lie. Alfred Wegener saw similarities to his own theory, but did not endorse Mantovani's earth-expansion hypothesis. He wrote:

In a short article in 1909 Mantovani expressed some ideas on continental displacement and explained them by means of maps which differ in part from mine but at some points agree astonishingly closely: for example, in regard to the earlier grouping of the southern continents around southern Africa.

He died in Paris.
