= Continental drift =

Movement of Earth's continents relative to each other

Continental drift is the movement of Earth's continents relative to each other over geologic time. When initially proposed as a scientific theory in the early 20th century, the idea that continents could move was widely rejected. However, continental drift has subsequently been extensively validated and is incorporated into the science of plate tectonics, which studies the movement of the continents as they ride on plates of the Earth's lithosphere.

The speculation that continents might have "drifted" was first put forward by Abraham Ortelius in 1596. A pioneer of the modern view of mobilism was Austrian geologist Otto Ampferer. The concept was independently and more fully developed by Alfred Wegener in 1912, and expanded into book form with his 1915 publication, Die Entstehung der Kontinente und Ozeane (The Origin of Continents and Oceans). However, at that time his hypothesis was rejected by many, largely because there was no known geological mechanism which could propel such massive movements. In 1931, English geologist Arthur Holmes proposed mantle convection for that mechanism, which is now known to be powered by radioactive decay and primordial heat and a much smaller amount of heat from tidal heating.

== History ==
=== Early history ===
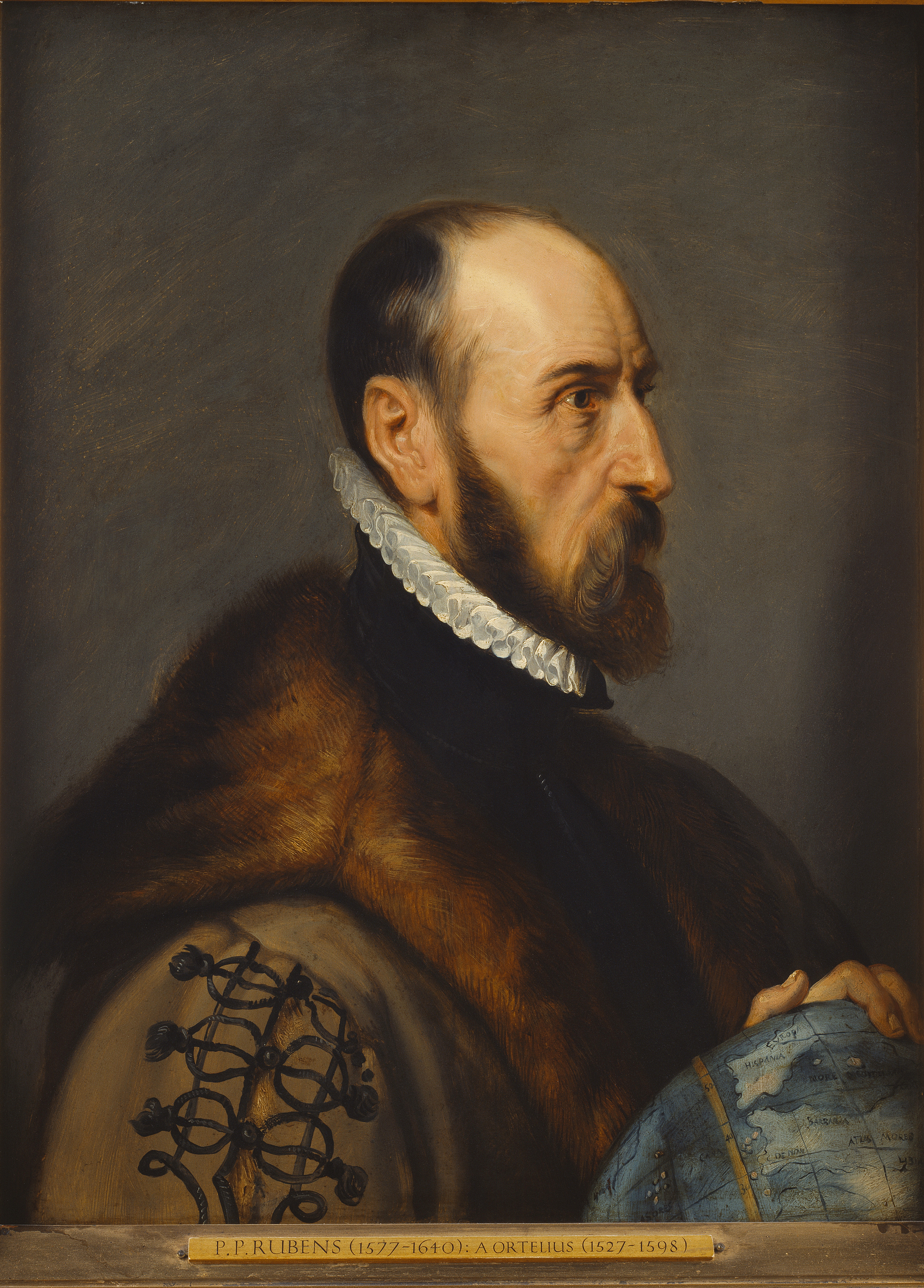
Abraham Ortelius by Peter Paul Rubens, 1633

Abraham Ortelius (Ortelius 1596), Theodor Christoph Lilienthal (1756), Alexander von Humboldt (1801 and 1845), Antonio Snider-Pellegrini (Snider-Pellegrini 1858), and others had noted earlier that the shapes of continents on opposite sides of the Atlantic Ocean (most notably, Africa and South America) seem to fit together. W. J. Kious described Ortelius's thoughts in this way:

Abraham Ortelius in his work Thesaurus Geographicus ... suggested that the Americas were "torn away from Europe and Africa ... by earthquakes and floods" and went on to say: "The vestiges of the rupture reveal themselves if someone brings forward a map of the world and considers carefully the coasts of the three [continents]."

In 1889, Alfred Russel Wallace remarked that "It was formerly a very general belief, even amongst geologists, that the great features of the earth's surface, no less than the smaller ones, were subject to continual mutations, and that during the course of known geological time the continents and great oceans had, again and again, changed places with each other." He quotes Charles Lyell as saying, "Continents, therefore, although permanent for whole geological epochs, shift their positions entirely in the course of ages." and claims that the first to throw doubt on this was James Dwight Dana in 1849.

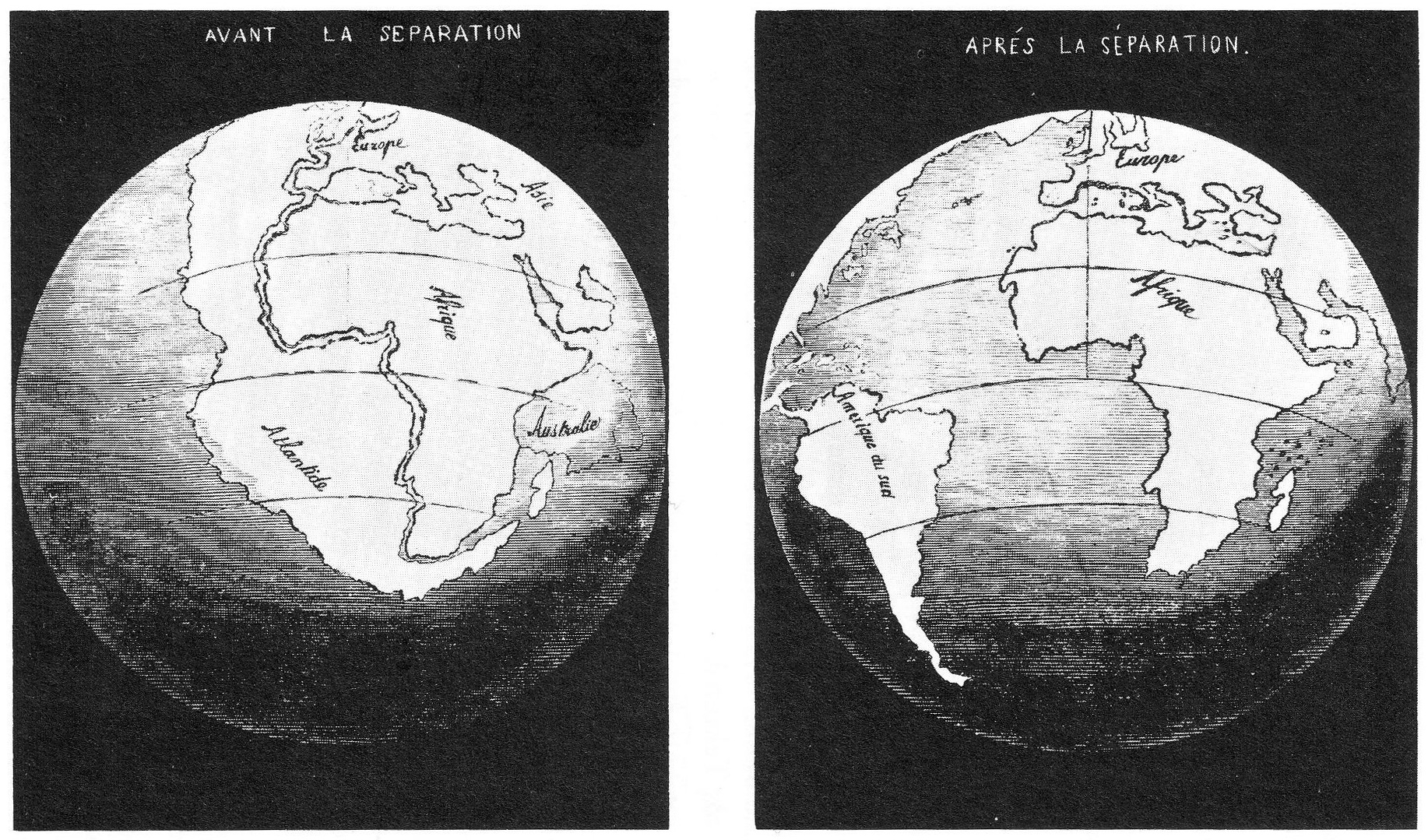
Antonio Snider-Pellegrini's Illustration of the closed and opened Atlantic Ocean (1858)

In his Manual of Geology (1863), Dana wrote, "The continents and oceans had their general outline or form defined in earliest time. This has been proved with regard to North America from the position and distribution of the first beds of the Lower Silurian, – those of the Potsdam epoch. The facts indicate that the continent of North America had its surface near tide-level, part above and part below it (p.196); and this will probably be proved to be the condition in Primordial time of the other continents also. And, if the outlines of the continents were marked out, it follows that the outlines of the oceans were no less so". Dana was enormously influential in America—his Manual of Mineralogy is still in print in revised form—and the theory became known as the Permanence theory.

This appeared to be confirmed by the exploration of the deep sea beds conducted by the Challenger expedition, 1872–1876, which showed that contrary to expectation, land debris brought down by rivers to the ocean is deposited comparatively close to the shore on what is now known as the continental shelf. This suggested that the oceans were a permanent feature of the Earth's surface, rather than having "changed places" with the continents.

Eduard Suess had proposed a supercontinent Gondwana in 1885, and the Tethys Ocean in 1893, assuming a land-bridge between the present continents submerged in the form of a geosyncline, and John Perry had written an 1895 paper proposing that the Earth's interior was fluid, and disagreeing with Lord Kelvin on the age of the Earth.

French geographer Elisée Reclus (1830 – 1905) presented evidence for a supercontinent and theorized continental drift fifty years prior to Wegener in his 1872 work The Earth. James O. Berkland argued that Reclus should be recognized "in the history of the development of plate tectonic theory as one of its foremost pioneers and, perhaps, as its founder". In 2021, Reclus, a tectonics database, was named for Elisée Reclus.

=== Wegener and his predecessors ===
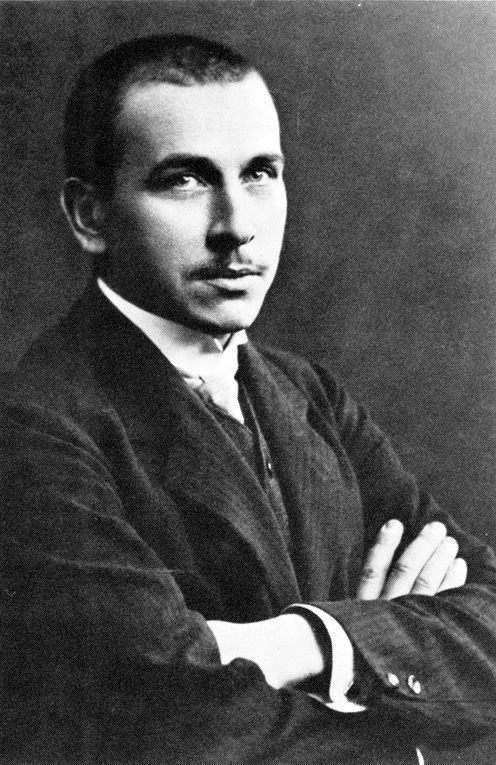
Alfred Wegener

Apart from the earlier speculations mentioned above, the idea that the American continents had once formed a single landmass with Eurasia and Africa was postulated by several scientists before Alfred Wegener's 1912 paper. Although Wegener's theory was formed independently and was more complete than those of his predecessors, Wegener later credited a number of past authors with similar ideas: Franklin Coxworthy (between 1848 and 1890), Roberto Mantovani (between 1889 and 1909), William Henry Pickering (1907), and Frank Bursley Taylor (1908).

The similarity of southern continent geological formations had led Roberto Mantovani to conjecture in 1889 and 1909 that all the continents had once been joined into a supercontinent; Wegener noted the similarity of Mantovani's and his own maps of the former positions of the southern continents. In Mantovani's conjecture, this continent broke due to volcanic activity caused by thermal expansion, and the new continents drifted away from each other because of further expansion of the rip-zones, where the oceans now lie. This led Mantovani to propose a now-discredited Expanding Earth theory.

Continental drift without expansion was proposed by Frank Bursley Taylor, who suggested in 1908 (published in 1910) that the continents were moved into their present positions by a process of "continental creep", later proposing a mechanism of increased tidal forces during the Cretaceous dragging the crust towards the equator. He was the first to realize that one of the effects of continental motion would be the formation of mountains, attributing the formation of the Himalayas to the collision between the Indian subcontinent with Asia. Wegener said that of all those theories, Taylor's had the most similarities to his own. For a time in the mid-20th century, the theory of continental drift was referred to as the "Taylor-Wegener hypothesis".

Alfred Wegener first presented his hypothesis to the German Geological Society on 6 January 1912. He proposed that the continents had once formed a single landmass, which he called Pangaea, before breaking apart and drifting to their present locations.

Wegener was the first to use the phrase "continental drift" (1912, 1915) (German: "die Verschiebung der Kontinente") and to publish the hypothesis that the continents had somehow "drifted" apart. Although he presented much evidence for continental drift, he was unable to provide a convincing explanation for the physical processes which might have caused this drift. He suggested that the continents had been pulled apart by the centrifugal pseudoforce (Polflucht) of the Earth's rotation or by a small component of astronomical precession, but calculations showed that the force was not sufficient. The Polflucht hypothesis was also studied by Paul Sophus Epstein in 1920 and found to be implausible.

=== Rejection of Wegener's theory, 1910s–1950s ===
Continental drift is now generally accepted, and it always had a minority of scientific proponents since Wegener. However, the theory was largely rejected for many years, with evidence in its favor considered insufficient, and Wegener did not live to see his hypothesis triumph. One problem was that a plausible driving force was missing. A second was that Wegener's estimate of the speed of continental motion, 250 cm/year (100 in/year), was implausibly high. (The currently accepted rate for the separation of the Americas from Europe and Africa is about 2.5 cm/year (1 in/year).) Furthermore, Wegener was treated less seriously because he was not a geologist. Even today, the details of the forces propelling the plates are poorly understood.

The English geologist Arthur Holmes championed the theory of continental drift at a time when it was deeply unfashionable. He proposed in 1931 that the Earth's mantle contained convection cells which dissipated heat produced by radioactive decay and moved the crust at the surface. His Principles of Physical Geology, ending with a chapter on continental drift, was published in 1944.

Geological maps of the time showed huge land bridges spanning the Atlantic and Indian oceans to account for the similarities of fauna and flora and the divisions of the Asian continent in the Permian period, but failing to account for glaciation in India, Australia and South Africa.

==== The fixists ====
Hans Stille and Leopold Kober opposed the idea of continental drift and worked on a "fixist" geosyncline model with Earth contraction playing a key role in the formation of orogens. Other geologists who opposed continental drift were Bailey Willis, Charles Schuchert, Rollin Chamberlin, Walther Bucher and Walther Penck. Willem van der Gracht was virtually the only tectonicist who supported mobilism. In 1939 an international geological conference was held in Frankfurt, organized by the fixist Hans Cloos, which expounded abundant criticism of continental drift and mobilism from the perspectives of tectonics, sedimentology (Nölke), paleontology (Nölke), mechanics (Lehmann) and oceanography (Troll, Wüst). Cloos and Troll maintained that excepting the Pacific Ocean, continents were not radically different from oceans in their behaviour. The mobilist theory of Émile Argand for the Alpine orogeny was criticized by Kurt Leuchs. The few drifters and mobilists at the conference appealed to biogeography (Kirsch, Wittmann), paleoclimatology (Kurt Wegener, brother of Alfred Wegener), paleontology (Gerth) and geodetic measurements (Kurt Wegener). F. Bernauer correctly equated Reykjanes in south-west Iceland with the Mid-Atlantic Ridge, arguing with this that the floor of the Atlantic Ocean was undergoing extension just like Reykjanes. Bernauer thought this extension had drifted the continents only 100–200 km (60–120 mi) apart, the approximate width of the volcanic zone in Iceland.

David Attenborough, who attended university in the second half of the 1940s, recounted an incident illustrating the dismissal of the theory: "I once asked one of my lecturers why he was not talking to us about continental drift and I was told, sneeringly, that if I could prove there was a force that could move continents, then he might think about it. The idea was moonshine, I was informed."

As late as 1953—just five years before Carey introduced the theory of plate tectonics—the theory of continental drift was rejected by the physicist Adrian Scheidegger on the following grounds.

- First, it had been shown that floating masses on a rotating geoid would collect at the equator, and stay there. This would explain one, but only one, mountain-building episode between any pair of continents; it failed to account for earlier orogenic episodes.
- Second, masses floating freely in a fluid substratum, like icebergs in the ocean, should be in isostatic equilibrium (in which the forces of gravity and buoyancy are in balance). But gravitational measurements showed that many areas are not in isostatic equilibrium.
- Third, there was the problem of why some parts of the Earth's surface (crust) should have solidified while other parts were still fluid. Various attempts to explain this foundered on other difficulties.

=== Road to acceptance ===
From the 1930s to the late 1950s, works by Vening-Meinesz, Holmes, Umbgrove, and numerous others outlined concepts that were close or nearly identical to modern plate tectonics theory, which has encompassed and superseded continental drift. The English geologist Arthur Holmes proposed in 1920 that plate junctions might lie beneath the sea, and in 1928 that convection currents within the mantle might be the driving force. Holmes's views were particularly influential: in his bestselling textbook, Principles of Physical Geology, he included a chapter on continental drift, proposing that Earth's mantle contained convection cells which dissipated radioactive heat and moved the crust at the surface. Holmes's proposal resolved the phase disequilibrium objection (the underlying fluid was kept from solidifying by radioactive heating from the core). However, scientific communication in the 1930s and 1940s was inhibited by World War II, and the theory still required work to overcome the orogeny and isostasy objections. Worse, the most viable forms of the theory predicted the existence of convection cell boundaries reaching deep into the Earth, which had not been observed.

In 1947, a team of scientists led by Maurice Ewing confirmed the existence of a rise in the central Atlantic Ocean, and found that the floor of the seabed beneath the sediments was chemically and physically different from continental crust. As oceanographers continued to bathymeter the ocean basins, a system of mid-oceanic ridges was detected. An important conclusion was that along this system, new ocean floor was being created, a process, dubbed seafloor spreading by Robert S. Dietz, that led to the concept of the "Great Global Rift".

Meanwhile, scientists began recognizing odd magnetic variations across the ocean floor using devices developed during World War II to detect submarines. Over the next decade, it became increasingly clear that the magnetization patterns were not anomalies, as had been originally supposed. In a series of papers published between 1959 and 1963, Heezen, Dietz, Hess, Mason, Vine, Matthews, and Morley collectively realized that the magnetization of the ocean floor formed extensive, zebra-like patterns: one stripe would exhibit normal polarity and the adjoining stripes reversed polarity. The best explanation was the "conveyor belt" or Vine–Matthews–Morley hypothesis. New magma from deep within the Earth rises easily through these weak zones and eventually erupts along the crest of the ridges to create new oceanic crust. The new crust is magnetized by the Earth's magnetic field, which undergoes occasional reversals. Formation of new crust then displaces the magnetized crust away from the rift, akin to a conveyor belt.

Without workable alternatives to explain the stripes, geophysicists were forced to conclude that Holmes had been right: ocean rifts were sites of perpetual orogeny at the boundaries of convection cells. By 1967, barely two decades after discovery of the mid-oceanic rifts, and a decade after discovery of the striping, plate tectonics had become axiomatic to modern geophysics.

In addition, Marie Tharp provided essential corroboration using her skills in cartography and seismographic data. She collaborated with Bruce Heezen, who was initially sceptical of Tharp's assertions that her maps confirmed continental drift.

==== Modern evidence ====
The geophysicists Jack Oliver, Bryan Isacks and Lynn Sykes provided seismologic evidence for plate tectonics with the 1968 article "Seismology and the New Global Tectonics", using data from seismologic stations including those he set up in the South Pacific. The modern theory of plate tectonics, refining Wegener, explains that there are two kinds of crust of different composition, continental and oceanic, both floating on a much deeper "plastic" mantle. Continental crust is inherently lighter. Oceanic crust is created at spreading centers and descends back into the mantle at subduction zones, driving the system of plates chaotically, with continuous orogeny and areas of isostatic imbalance.

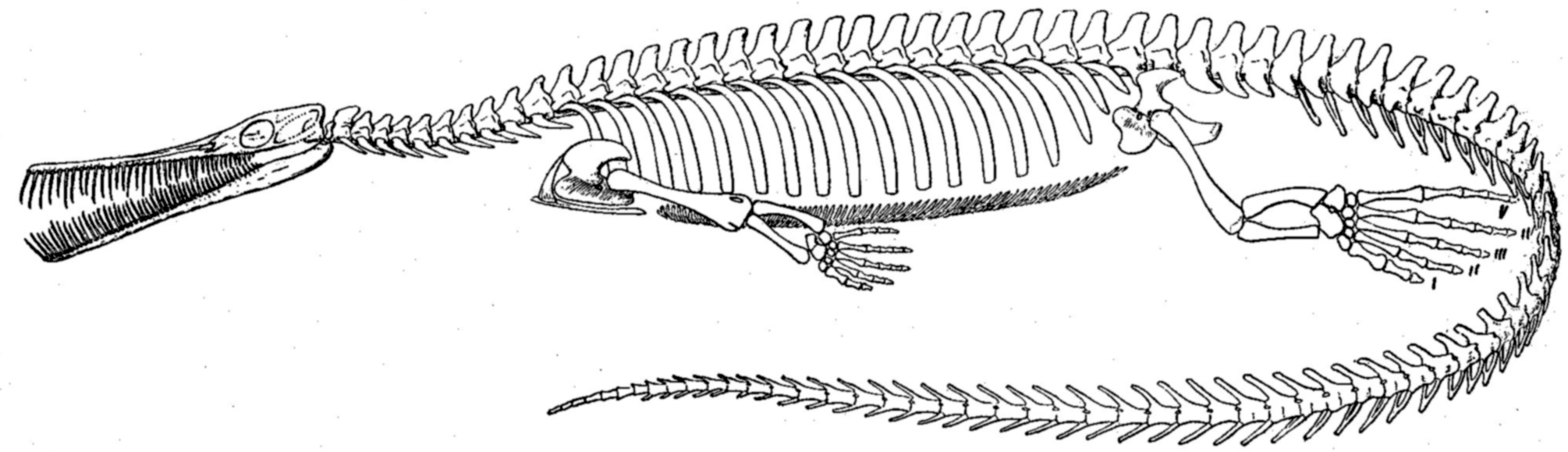
Mesosaurus skeleton, MacGregor, 1908

A paleomap showing fossil patterns across continents (Gondwanaland)

Evidence for the movement of continents on tectonic plates is now extensive. Similar plant and animal fossils are found around the shores of different continents, suggesting that they were once joined. The fossils of Mesosaurus, a freshwater reptile rather like a small crocodile, found both in Brazil and South Africa, are one example; another is the discovery of fossils of the land reptile Lystrosaurus in rocks of the same age at locations in Africa, India, and Antarctica. There is also living evidence, with the same animals being found on two continents. Some earthworm families (such as Ocnerodrilidae, Acanthodrilidae, Octochaetidae) are found in South America and Africa.

The complementary arrangement of the facing sides of South America and Africa is an obvious and temporary coincidence. In millions of years, slab pull, ridge-push, and other forces of tectonophysics will further separate and rotate those two continents. It was that temporary feature that inspired Wegener to propose continental drift.

The widespread distribution of Permo-Carboniferous glacial sediments in South America, Africa, Madagascar, Arabia, India, Antarctica and Australia was one of the major pieces of evidence for the theory of continental drift. The continuity of glaciers, inferred from oriented glacial striations and tillite deposits, suggested the existence of the supercontinent of Gondwana, which became a central element of the concept of continental drift. Striations indicated glacial flow away from the equator and toward the poles, based on continents' current positions and orientations, and supported the idea that the southern continents had previously been in dramatically different locations contiguous with one another.

==== GPS evidence ====
Today continental drift can be directly measured with Global Positioning Satellite systems. A GPS device placed in Maui, Hawaii, moved about 48 cm latitudinally and about 84 cm longitudinally over 14 years.

== See also ==
- Geological history of Earth
- Israel C. White

== General and cited sources ==
- Frankel, Henry R. (2012). The Continental Drift Controversy. Vol. I: Wegener and the Early Debate. Cambridge.
- Le Grand, Homer Eugene (1988). Drifting Continents and Shifting Theories. Cambridge University. ISBN 978-0-521-31105-2.
- Oreskes, Naomi (1999). The Rejection of Continental Drift. Oxford University Press. ISBN 978-0-19-511732-5. (pb: 0-19-511733-6)
- Oreskes, Naomi (2002). "Continental Drift" (PDF). In Munn, Ted; MacCracken, Michael C.; Perry, John S. (eds.). Encyclopedia of Global Environmental Change. Vol. 1. Chichester, West Sussex: John Wiley & Sons. pp. 321–325. ISBN 978-0-471-97796-4. OCLC 633880622. Archived from the original (PDF) on 4 February 2012.
- Ortelius, Abraham (1596) [1570]. Thesaurus Geographicus (in Latin) (3 ed.). Antwerp: Plantin. OCLC 214324616. (First edition published 1570, 1587 edition online)
- Şengör, Celâl (1982). "Classical theories of orogenesis". In Miyashiro, Akiho; Aki, Keiiti; Şengör, Celâl (eds.). Orogeny. John Wiley & Sons. ISBN 978-0-471-103769.
- Snider-Pellegrini, Antonio (1858). La Création et ses mystères dévoilés. Paris: Frank and Dentu..
