= Mineralogical Observations on Some Basalts on the Rhine =

Mineralogical Observations on Some Basalts on the Rhine (German original title: Mineralogische Beobachtungen über einige Basalte am Rhein) is an early work by Alexander von Humboldt (1769–1859), published anonymously in 1790 in Braunschweig "at the School bookstore" (Schulbuchhandlung). The mineralogical treatise is dedicated to Georg Forster (1754–1794) – at that time Court Councillor and Librarian of Electoral Mainz – "with deepest friendship and reverence." It is listed as one of Humboldt's major works.

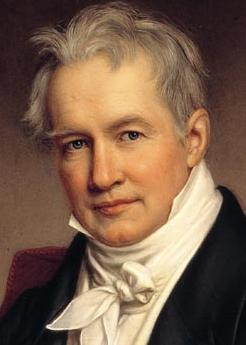
Alexander von Humboldt (painting by Joseph Karl Stieler, 1843)

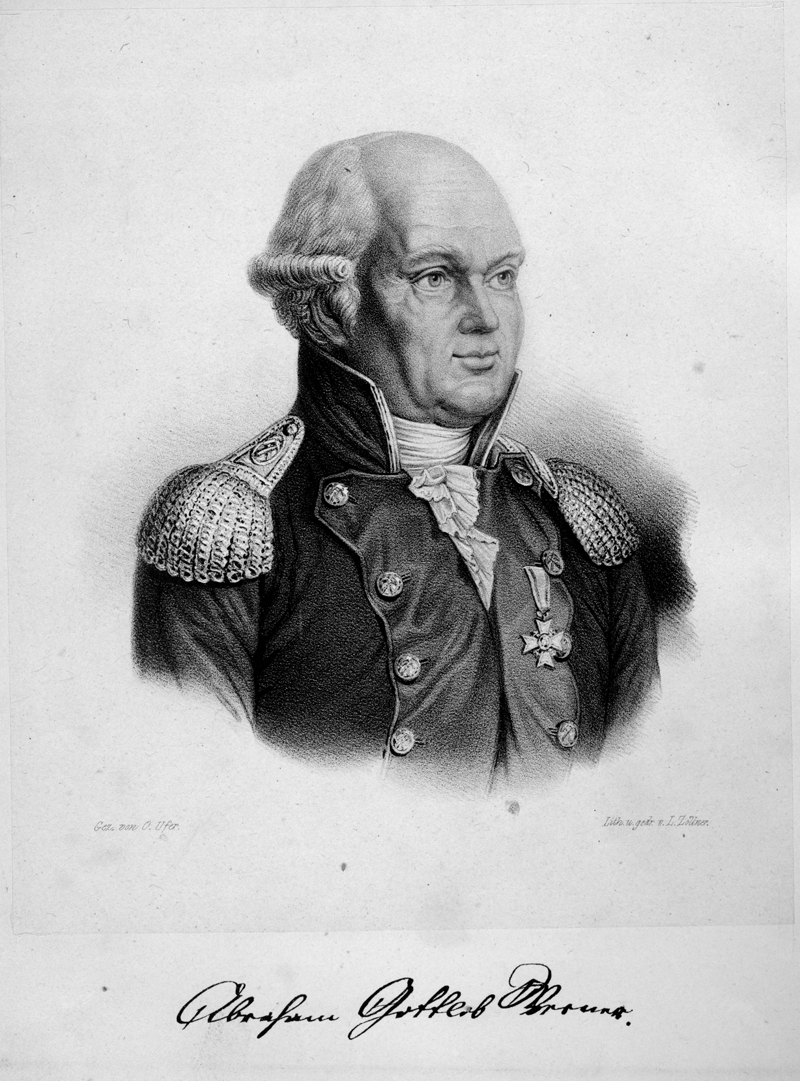
The "founder" of Neptunism, Abraham Gottlob Werner
