= Anton Moro =

Italian abbot, geologist and naturalist

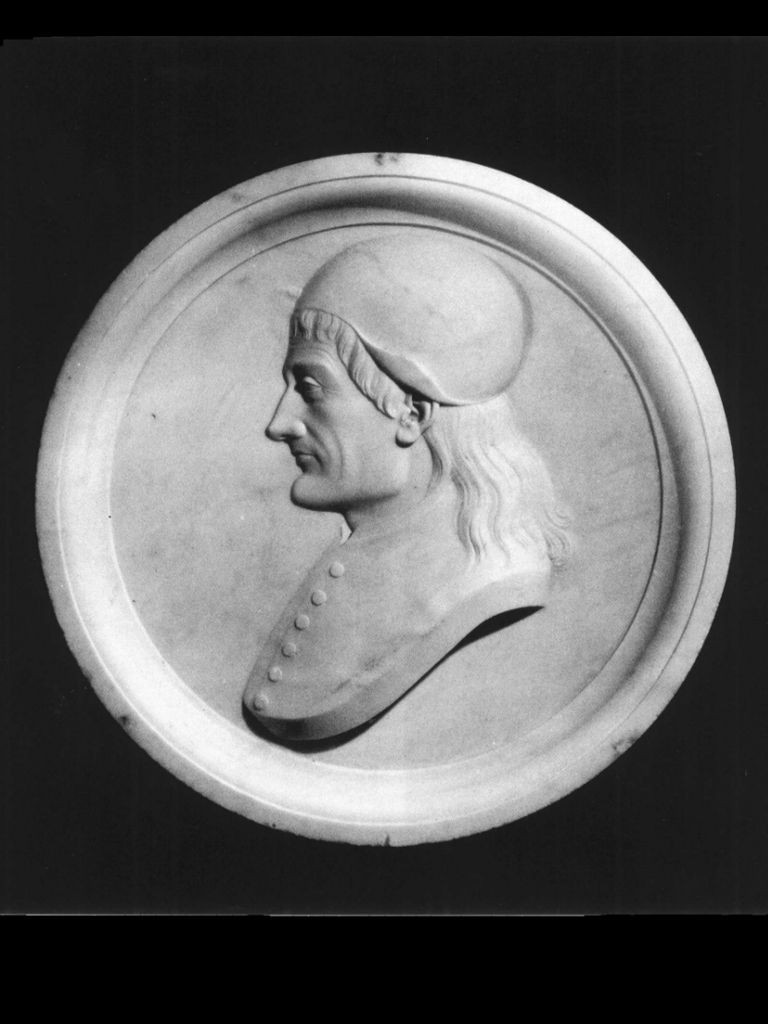
- Medal of Lazzaro Moro. Panteon Veneto, Istituto Veneto di Scienze, Lettere ed Arti
- Born: Anton Lazzaro Moro; 16 March 1687; San Vito al Tagliamento, Republic of Venice
- Died: 3 March 1764 (aged 76); San Vito al Tagliamento, Republic of Venice
- Occupations: Abbot; Geologist; Naturalist
- Known for: Plutonism
- Parent(s): Bernardino Moro and Felicita Moro (née Mauro)
- Scientific career
- Fields: Paleontology, geology

Anton Lazzaro Moro (16 March 1687 – 3 April 1764) was an Italian abbot, geologist and naturalist. He was one of the leading advocates of plutonism in the early debate that confronted plutonism with neptunism, making him described by some authors as an ultraplutonist. Moro was the first to discriminate sedimentary rocks from volcanic ones by studying the rocks of volcanic islands. In his study of the crustaceans, he discovered fossils petrified in mountains that led him to deduce that those rocks were once buried in the sea. Moro's work was singled out for praise by Charles Lyell in his Principles of Geology.

== Biography ==
Born into a modest family in the small town of San Vito al Tagliamento, he attended the seminary in Portogruaro and was ordained a priest in 1710. In the following years, he deepened his studies in anatomy, physiology, and natural history. In 1721, he became director of the seminary in Feltre, where he also taught philosophy.

In his later life he was appointed as parish priest of the small village of Corbolone, a position he held almost until his death. Moro died in his hometown on 3 March 1764, aged 76. The lunar mountain Mons Moro is named after him.

Moro devoted in depth research to the study of natural history. From his personal observations of the mountains in the Friuli region and from accounts of the eruption near Santorini that led to the formation of the island of Nea Kameni in 1707, he theorized that inside the earth was a ball of liquid fire and that mountains were upheaved from the sea. He hypothesized that fossils of marine animals were found petrified inside rocks because they had grown in sea water before the mountains had risen above the sea level.

He published the results of his researches in the book De' Crostacei (1740). The work sparked heated controversy throughout Europe and was soon translated into German and published in Leipzig in 1751. Moro corresponded with several prominent scientists and scholars of his age, including Scipione Maffei, Giovanni Lami, Giovanni Bianchi, and Johann Balthasar Ehrhart.

== Contributions ==
Moro is considered one of the fathers of modern geology. In his seminal work, De' crostacei e degli altri Marini corpi che si truovano su' monti (1740), he strongly attacked earlier ideas by Thomas Burnet and John Woodward who attributed marine accumulations to the Biblical Deluge.

Moro was an early supporter of uniformitarianism, a geological principle that suggests the Earth's processes have remained consistent over time. He challenged the prevailing catastrophist theories, proposing that geological formations were a result of natural, ongoing processes, rather than solely from a single, catastrophic event like Noah's flood. He suggested that Noah's flood was a more localized event and attributed rock stratification to volcanic activity.

Moro was the first to propose the occurrence of the raising of islands and continents through volcanic fire over a long period of time, hence initiating the discussion of plutonism and neptunism as Werner would purpose a theory that directly opposed his own. James Hutton’s Theory of the Earth contains observations and conclusions similar to those made by Moro half a century earlier.

== Book ==
- De' crostacei e degli altri Marini corpi che si truovano su' monti [Of the Crustaceans, and of Other Marine Bodies found on Mountains]. Venice: S. Monti. 1740.

== Bibliography ==
- Thomasian, Rose (1970). "Moro, Antonio-Lazzaro". In Charles Coulston Gillispie (ed.). Dictionary of Scientific Biography. Vol. 9. New York: Charles Scribner's Sons. pp. 531–534.
- De' Crostacei e Degli Altri Marini Corpi Che Si Trouvano su Monti - full digital facsimile at Linda Hall Library
- Farinella, Calogero (2012). "MORO, Anton Lazzaro". Dizionario Biografico degli Italiani (in Italian). Vol. 77: Morlini–Natolini. Rome: Istituto dell'Enciclopedia Italiana. ISBN 978-88-12-00032-6.
