= Leander Starr Jameson =

British colonial politician (1853–1917)

The Right Honourable Sir Leander Starr Jameson Bt KCMG CB
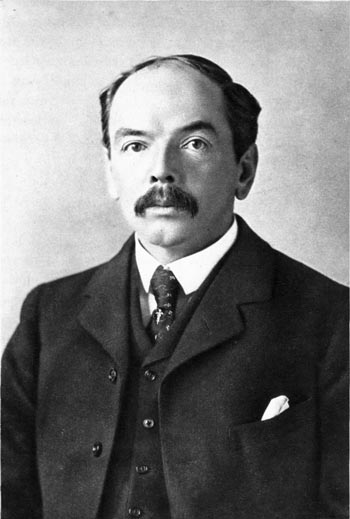

10th Prime Minister of the Cape Colony
- In office 22 February 1904 – 2 February 1908
- Monarch: Edward VII
- Governor: Walter Hely-Hutchinson
- Preceded by: Gordon Sprigg
- Succeeded by: John X. Merriman

2nd Administrator of Southern Rhodesia
- In office 10 September 1894 – 2 April 1896
- Monarch: Queen Victoria
- Preceded by: A. R. Colquhoun
- Succeeded by: The Earl Grey

2nd Chief Magistrate of Southern Rhodesia
- In office 18 September 1891 – 7 October 1893
- Monarch: Queen Victoria
- Preceded by: A. R. Colquhoun
- Succeeded by: A. H. F. Duncan

Personal details
- Born: Leander Starr Jameson; 9 February 1853 Stranraer, Scotland
- Died: 26 November 1917 (aged 64) London, England
- Resting place: Matopos Hills, Rhodesia (now Zimbabwe)
- Party: Progressive Party (Cape Colony); Unionist Party (South Africa)
- Education: University College London
- Occupation: Physician

Sir Leander Starr Jameson, 1st Baronet, KCMG, CB, PC (9 February 1853 – 26 November 1917), also known as Starr Jameson, was a British colonial politician and Prime Minister of the Cape Colony from 1904-1908. He was best known for his involvement in the ill-fated Jameson Raid.

== Early life and family ==
He was born on 9 February 1853, the youngest of 12 children of Robert William Jameson (1805–1868), a Writer to the Signet, and Christian Pringle, daughter of Major-General Pringle of Symington House.

Leander Starr Jameson was born at Stranraer, Wigtownshire (now part of Dumfries and Galloway), a great-nephew of Robert Jameson, Regius Professor of Natural History at the University of Edinburgh. Fort's biography of Jameson notes that Starr's "chief Gamaliel, however, was a Professor Grant, a man of advanced age, who had been a pupil of his great-uncle, the Professor of Natural History at Edinburgh."

Robert William Jameson started his career as an advocate in Edinburgh, and was Writer to the Signet, before becoming a playwright, published poet and editor of The Wigtownshire Free Press. A radical and reformist, he was the author of the dramatic poem Nimrod (1848) and Timoleon, a tragedy in five acts informed by the anti-slavery movement. Timoleon was performed at the Adelphi Theatre in Edinburgh in 1852, and ran to a second edition. In due course, the Jameson family moved to London, living in Chelsea and Kensington. Leander Starr Jameson went to the Godolphin School in Hammersmith, where he did well in both lessons and games prior to his university education.

Leander was educated for the medical profession at University College Hospital, London, for which he passed his entrance examinations in January 1870. He distinguished himself as a medical student, becoming a Gold Medallist in materia medica. After qualifying as a doctor, he was made Resident Medical Officer at University College Hospital (M.R.C.S. 1875; M.D. 1877). After acting as house physician, house surgeon and demonstrator of anatomy, and showing promise of a successful professional career in London, his health broke down from overwork in 1878, and he went out to South Africa and settled down in practice at Kimberley. There he rapidly acquired a great reputation as a medical man, and, besides numbering President Kruger and the Matabele chief Lobengula among his patients, came much into contact with Cecil Rhodes.

Jameson was for some time the inDuna of the Matabele king's favourite regiment, the Imbeza. Lobengula expressed his delight with Jameson's successful medical treatment of his gout by honouring him with the rare status of inDuna. Although white, he underwent the initiation ceremonies linked with this honour. His status as an inDuna gave him certain advantages. In 1888, he successfully exerted his influence with Lobengula to induce the chieftain to grant the concessions to the agents of Rhodes which led to the formation of the British South Africa Company; and when the company proceeded to open up Mashonaland, Jameson abandoned his medical practice and joined the pioneer expedition of 1890. From this time his fortunes were bound up with Rhodes' schemes in the north. Immediately after the pioneer column had occupied Mashonaland, Jameson, with F.C. Selous and A.R. Colquhoun, went east to Manicaland and was instrumental in securing the greater part of the country, to which Portugal was laying claim, for the Chartered Company. In 1891, Jameson succeeded Colquhoun as Administrator of Mashonaland. In 1893, Jameson was a key figure in the First Matabele War and involved in incidents that led to the massacre of the Shangani Patrol.

== Character ==
Elizabeth Longford wrote of him, "Whatever one felt about him or his projects when he was not there, one could not help falling for the man in his presence.... People attached themselves to Jameson with extraordinary fervour, the more extraordinary because he made no effort to feed it. He affected an attitude of tough cynicism towards life, literature and any articulate form of idealism, particularly towards the hero-worship which he himself excited ... [After Starr's death,] The Times estimated that his astonishing personal hold over his followers had been equalled only by that of Parnell, the Irish patriot."

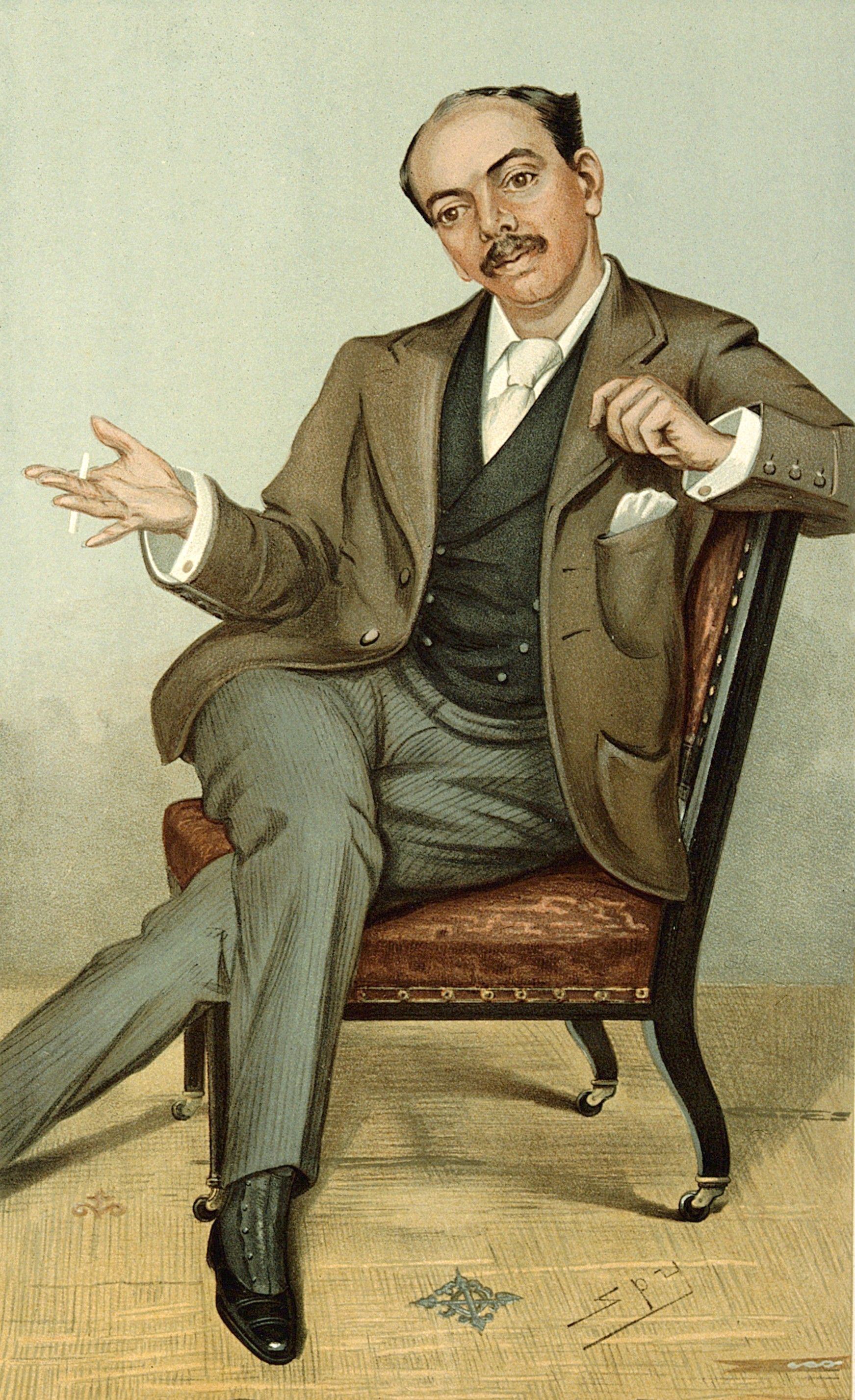
Caricature of Jameson from 1896 issue of Vanity Fair

Longford wrote that Rudyard Kipling wrote the poem "If—" with Leander Starr Jameson in mind as an inspiration for the characteristics he recommended young people to live by (notably Kipling's son, to whom the poem is addressed in the last lines). Longford writes, "Jameson was later to be the inspiration and hero of Rudyard Kipling's poem, If...". Direct evidence that the poem "If—" was written about Jameson is available also in Rudyard Kipling's autobiography in which Kipling writes that "If—" was "drawn from Jameson's character."

In 1895, Jameson led about 500 of his countrymen in what became known as the Jameson Raid against the Boers in southern Africa. The Jameson Raid was later cited by Winston Churchill as a major factor in bringing about the Boer War of 1899 to 1902. But the story as recounted in Britain was quite different. The British defeat was interpreted as a victory and Jameson was portrayed as a daring hero.

Seymour Fort 1918 wrote of L.S. Jameson in this way:

... It was not his wont to talk at length, nor was he, unless exceptionally interested, a good listener. He was so logical and so quick to grasp a situation, that he would often cut short exposition by some forcible remark or personal raillery that would all too often quite disconcert the speaker.

Despite his adventurous career, mere reminiscences obviously bored him; he was always for movement, for some betterment of present or future conditions, and in discussion he was a master of the art of persuasion, unconsciously creating in those around him a latent desire to follow, if he would lead. The source of such persuasive influence eludes analysis, and, like the mystery of leadership, is probably more psychic than mental. In this latter respect, Jameson was splendidly equipped; he had greater power of concentration, of logical reasoning, and of rapid diagnosis, while on his lighter side he was brilliant in repartee and in the exercise of a badinage that was both cynical and personal...

... He wrapped himself in cynicism as with a cloak, not only to protect himself against his own quick human sympathy, but to conceal the austere standard of duty and honour that he always set to himself. He was ever trying to hide from his friends his real attitude towards life, and the high estimate he placed upon accepted ethical values... He was essentially a patriot who sought for himself neither wealth, nor power, nor fame, nor leisure, nor even an easy anchorage for reflection. The wide sphere of his work and achievements, and the accepted dominion of his personality and his influence were both based upon his adherence to the principle of always subordinating personal considerations to the work in hand, upon the loyalty of his service to big ideals. His whole life seems to illustrate the truth of the saying that in self-regard and self-centredness there is no profit, and that only in sacrificing himself for impersonal aims can a man save his soul and benefit his fellow men.

A less flattering view is given in Antony Thomas's Rhodes (1996), in which Jameson is portrayed as unscrupulous.

== The Jameson Raid ==
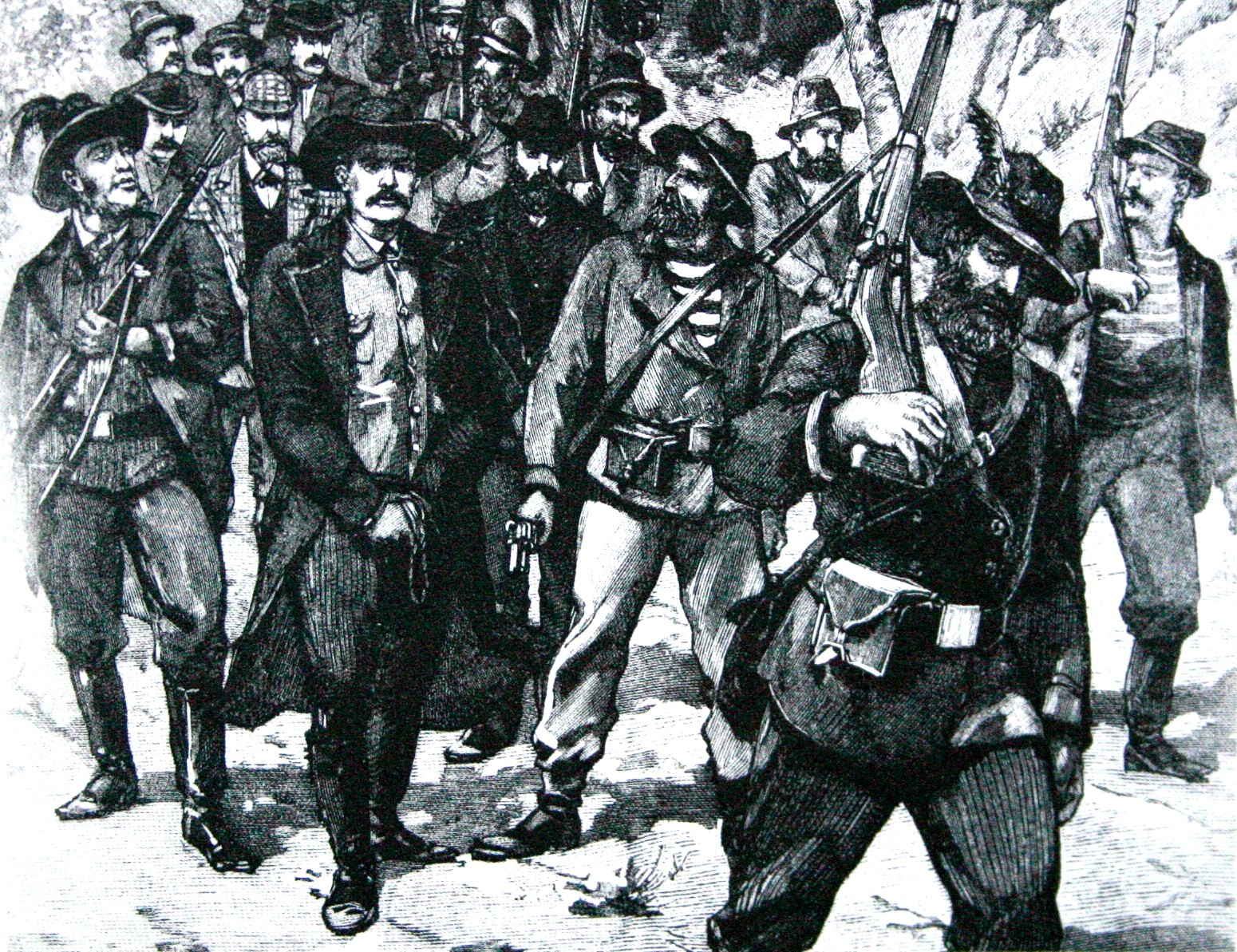
Arrest of Jameson after the raid – Petit Parisien 1896

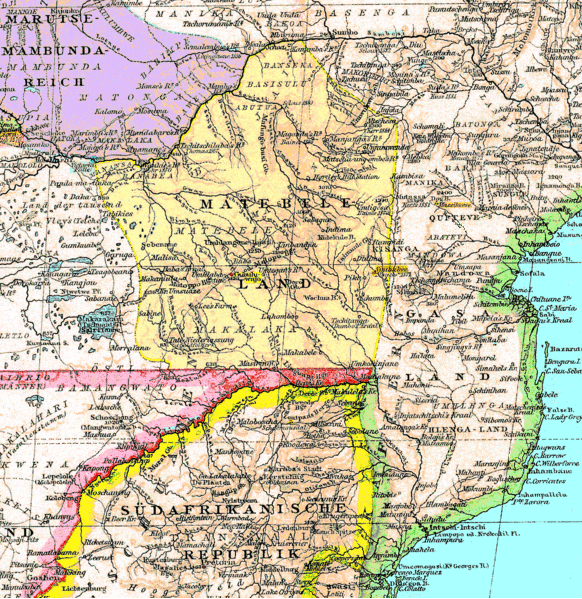
Matabeleland, 1887

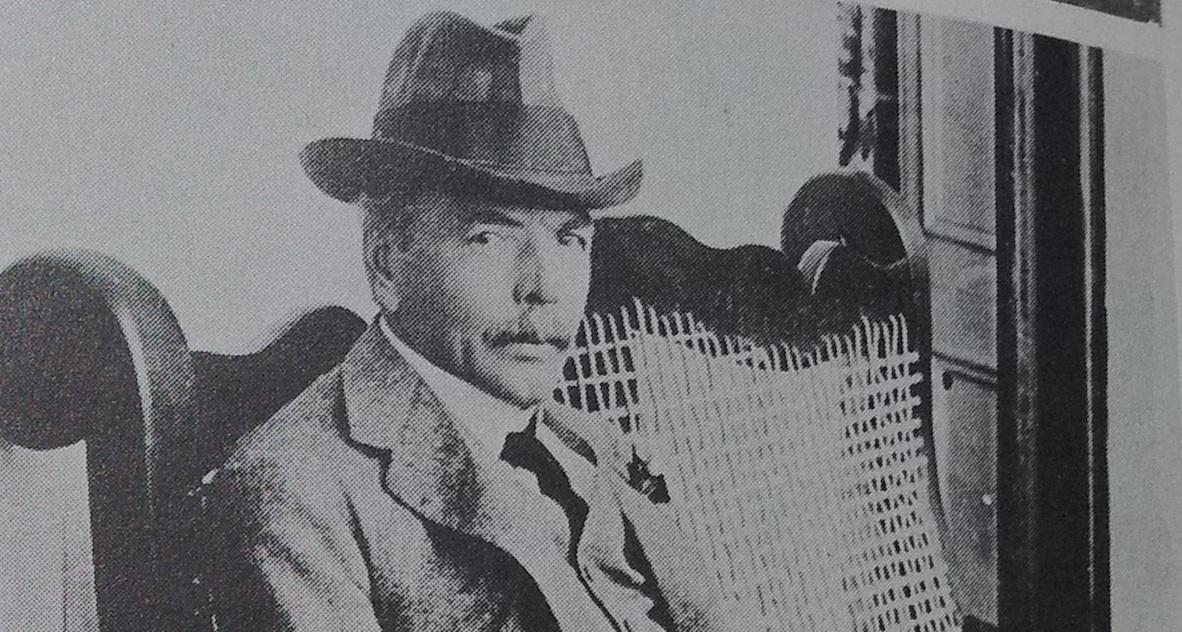
Leander Starr Jameson

In 1895, Jameson assembled a private army outside the Transvaal in preparation for the violent overthrow of the Boer government. The idea was to foment unrest among foreign workers (Uitlanders) in the territory, and use the outbreak of open revolt as an excuse to invade and annex the territory.

In November 1895, a piece of territory of strategic importance, the Pitsani Strip, part of the Bechuanaland Protectorate and bordering the Transvaal, was ceded to the British South Africa Company by the Colonial Office, overtly for the protection of a railway running through the territory. Cecil Rhodes, the Prime Minister of the Cape Colony and managing director of the company was eager to bring South Africa under British dominion, and encouraged the disenfranchised Uitlanders of the Boer republics to resist Afrikaner domination.

Rhodes hoped that the intervention of the company's private army could spark an Uitlander uprising, leading to the overthrow of the Transvaal government. Rhodes' forces were assembled in the Pitsani Strip for this purpose. Joseph Chamberlain informed Salisbury on Boxing Day that an uprising was expected, and was aware that an invasion would be launched, but was not sure when. The subsequent Jameson Raid was a debacle, leading to the invading force's surrender. Chamberlain, at Highbury Hall, his home in Birmingham, received a secret telegram from the Colonial Office on 31 December informing him of the beginning of the Raid.

Though sympathetic to the ultimate goals of the Raid, Chamberlain was uncomfortable with the timing of the invasion and remarked "if this succeeds it will ruin me. I'm going up to London to crush it". He swiftly travelled by train to the Colonial Office, ordering Sir Hercules Robinson, Governor of the Cape Colony, to repudiate the actions of Jameson and warned Rhodes that the company's Charter would be in danger if it were discovered that the Cape Prime Minister were involved in the Raid. The prisoners were returned to London for trial, and the Transvaal government received considerable compensation from the company. Jameson was tried in England for leading the raid; during that time he was lionised by the press and London society.

== The Jameson Raid trial ==
The Jameson Raiders arrived in England at the end of February 1896, to face prosecution under the Foreign Enlistment Act 1870 styled R. v Jameson, Willoughby and others. There were some months of investigations initially held at Bow Street Magistrates' Court, following which the trial at bar (a trial in front of multiple judges instead of a jury) began on 20 June 1896, at the High Court. The trial lasted seven days, following which Dr Jameson was "found guilty and sentenced to imprisonment as a first-class misdemeanant for fifteen months. He was, however, released from Holloway in the following December on account of illness."

During the trial of Jameson, Rhodes' solicitor, Bourchier Hawksley, refused to produce cablegrams that had passed between Rhodes and his agents in London during November and December 1895. According to Hawksley, these demonstrated that the Colonial Office 'influenced the actions of those in South Africa' who embarked on the Raid, and even that Chamberlain had transferred control of the Pitsani Strip to facilitate an invasion. Nine days before the Raid, Chamberlain had asked his Assistant Under-Secretary to encourage Rhodes to "hurry up" because of the developing Venezuela Crisis of 1895.

The conduct of Dr Jameson during the trial was graphically described by Krout 1899, an eyewitness account of her observations during the Jameson Raid trial. She wrote:

.... Dr. Jameson was very grave and he, alone, was somewhat ill at ease. As he entered the court room a dark flush mounted to his forehead, which slowly faded as he walked to his chair and seated himself with great deliberateness. He was a man somewhat below medium height, with a huge head carried a little to one side, showing a remarkable breadth of brow; the eyes were large, dark and sufficiently expressive, when not concealed by the heavy drooping lids that were frequently half, or wholly, closed; the nose was prominent and large and rather symmetrical, the chin and mouth indicated decided firmness; the whole expression and demeanour of the man evinced fearlessness that would be disposed to express itself in deeds rather than words. He, too, was carefully dressed in a dark frock coat and trousers, a spotless, white necktie and pale grey gloves-the conventional morning dress of an English gentleman. He walked with a heavy un-elastic tread and a slightly swinging carriage, and sat much of the time obliquely in his chair, one cheek resting upon his elegantly gloved hand; his glance was often cast down or fixed at rare intervals upon his counsel, Sir Edward Clarke; not once during the day, so far as I could observe, did he give more than a passing look at the witnesses upon the stand; to whatever was being drawn out of them he seemed quite indifferent, and, except for that first dull flush, he was equally oblivious of the spectators about him to whom he was a manifest object of interest. Such was the hero of one of the most daring raids in all the annals of border warfare; to all appearance a quiet, modest gentleman, in faultless and fashionable dress, with civilian stamped upon him from head to foot, and who would have been recognised anywhere as the circumspect, model family physician. He seemed pre-eminently a man to whom healing of wounds was far more congenial and better suited than blood-letting with Maxim guns and Lee-Metford rifles, after the manner which he had so rashly undertaken.

— Mary Krout

Jameson was sentenced to fifteen months in gaol, but was soon pardoned. In June 1896, Chamberlain, British Colonial Secretary of the day, offered his resignation to Lord Salisbury, having shown the Prime Minister one or more of the cablegrams implicating him in the Raid's planning. Salisbury refused to accept the offer, possibly reluctant to lose the government's most popular figure. Salisbury reacted aggressively in support of Chamberlain, supporting the Colonial Secretary's threat to withdraw the company's charter if the cablegrams were revealed. Accordingly, Rhodes refused to reveal the cablegrams, and as no evidence was produced showing that Chamberlain was complicit in the Raid's planning, the Select Committee appointed to investigate the events surrounding the Raid had no choice but to absolve Chamberlain of all responsibility.

Jameson had been Administrator General for Matabeleland at the time of the Raid and his intrusion into Transvaal depleted Matabeleland of many of its troops and left the whole territory vulnerable. Seizing on this weakness, and a discontent with the British South Africa Company, the Matabele revolted in March 1896 in what is now celebrated in Zimbabwe as the First War of Independence – the Second Matabele War. Hundreds of white settlers were killed within the first few weeks and many more would die over the next year and a half at the hands of both the Matabele and the Shona. With few troops to support them, the settlers had to quickly build a laager in the centre of Bulawayo on their own. Against over 50,000 Matabele held up in their stronghold of the Matobo Hills as the settlers mounted patrols under Burnham, Baden-Powell, and Selous. After the Matabele laid down their arms, the war continued until October 1897 in Mashonaland.

== Later political career ==
Despite the Raid, Jameson had a successful political life following the invasion, receiving many honours in later life. In 1903, Jameson was put forward as the leader of the Progressive (British) Party in the Cape Colony. When the party was successful he served as Prime Minister of the Cape Colony from 1904 to 1908. His government was unique in Cape history, as being the only Ministry to be composed exclusively of British politicians.

During the Conference of Colonial Premiers held in London in March 1907, he was made a Privy Counsellor. He served as the leader of the Unionist Party (South Africa) from its founding in 1910 until 1912, when Starr returned to England. (Jameson was defeated in the election of September 1910 by the nationalist South African Party and never held political power.)

Jameson served as chairman of the Central Prisoners of War Committee from its establishment in 1916 until his death.

== Honours ==
Leander Starr Jameson was awarded the CB. He was created a baronet on 1 February 1911.

== Death ==
Sir Leander Starr Jameson, 1st Bt., died on the afternoon of Monday, 26 November 1917, at his home, 2 Great Cumberland Place, Hyde Park, in London. His body was laid in a vault at Kensal Green Cemetery on 29 November 1917, where it remained until 1920 when it was exhumed and reburied alongside Cecil Rhodes at Malindidzimu Hill, a granite hill in the Matobo National Park, 40 kilometres (25 mi) south of Bulawayo. It was designated by Cecil Rhodes as the resting place for those who served Great Britain well in Africa.

== Biographies, portraits and honours ==
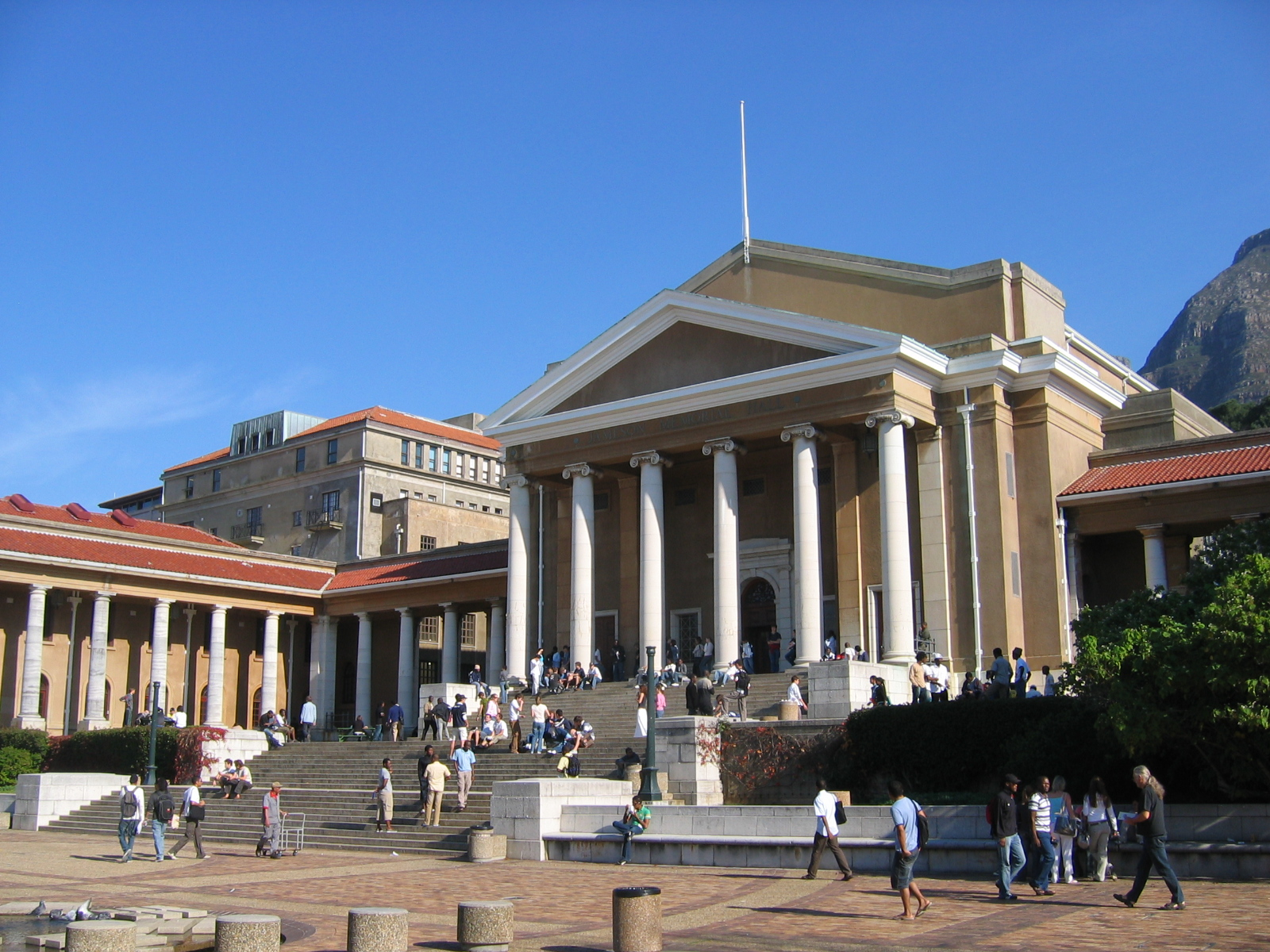
Jameson Hall and Jammie Plaza, the focal point of the University of Cape Town, were named in his honour.

Jameson's life is the subject of a number of biographies, including The Life of Jameson by Ian Colvin (1922, Vol. 1 and 1923, Vol. 2), Dr. Jameson by G. Seymour Fort (1918), and The If Man by Chris Ash (2012). The Jameson Raid has been the subject of numerous articles and books, and remains a fascinating historical riddle more than one hundred years after the events of the Raid took place.

There are three portraits of Jameson in the National Portrait Gallery in London. One of these was by one of his elder brothers, Middleton Jameson, R.A. (1851–1919).

During the colonial period, the Zambian town of Chipata was named "Fort Jameson" in Jameson's honour.

The English poet Rudyard Kipling wrote If— in honor of Jameson and his raid.

== Later historical documents ==
In 2002, The Van Riebeck Society published Sir Graham Bower’s Secret History of the Jameson Raid and the South African Crisis, 1895–1902, adding to growing historical evidence that the imprisonment and judgment upon the Raiders at the time of their trial was an underhand move by the British government, a result of political manoeuvres by Joseph Chamberlain and his staff to hide his own involvement and knowledge of the Raid. In his review of Sir Graham Bower’s Secret History... Alan Cousins, notes that, "A number of major themes and concerns emerge" from Bower's history, "... perhaps the most poignant being Sir Graham Bower's accounts of his being made a scapegoat in the aftermath of the raid: 'since a scapegoat was wanted I was willing to serve my country in that capacity'."

Political offices
| Preceded by A. R. Colquhoun (acting) | Chief Magistrate of Southern Rhodesia (Mashonaland); 1891–1893 | Succeeded by A. H. F. Duncan (acting) |
| Preceded by A. R. Colquhoun | Administrator of Southern Rhodesia; 1894–1896 | Succeeded by Albert Grey, 4th Earl Grey |
| Preceded by John Gordon Sprigg | Prime Minister of the Cape Colony; 1904–1908 | Succeeded by John X. Merriman |
Baronetage of the United Kingdom
| New creation | Baronet (of Down Street); 1911–1917 | Extinct |
| Preceded by Ebrahim baronets | Jameson baronets of Down Street; 1 February 1911 | Succeeded by Farrar baronets |
