= Vulcanism (disambiguation) =

Vulcanism is an alternative spelling of volcanism.

Vulcanism may also refer to:

- Plutonism, a geologic theory

== See also ==
- Volcanology, the study of volcanic phenomena
