= Robert Jameson =

British scientist (1774–1854)

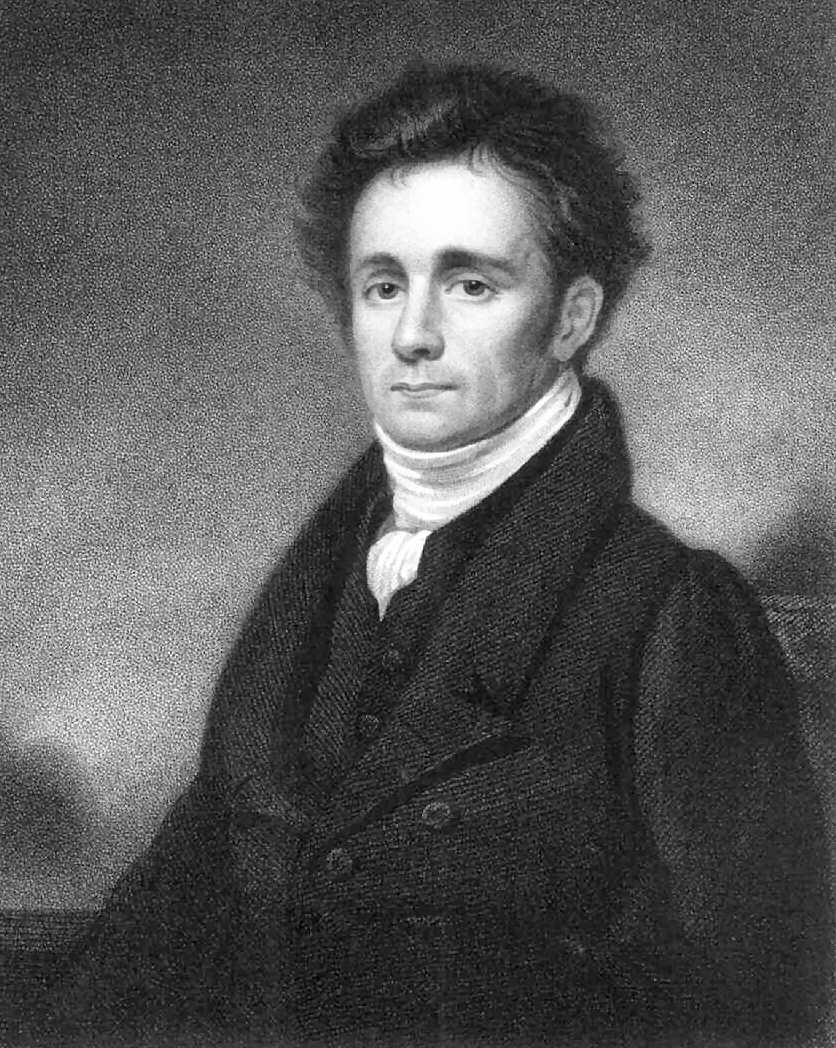
Robert Jameson

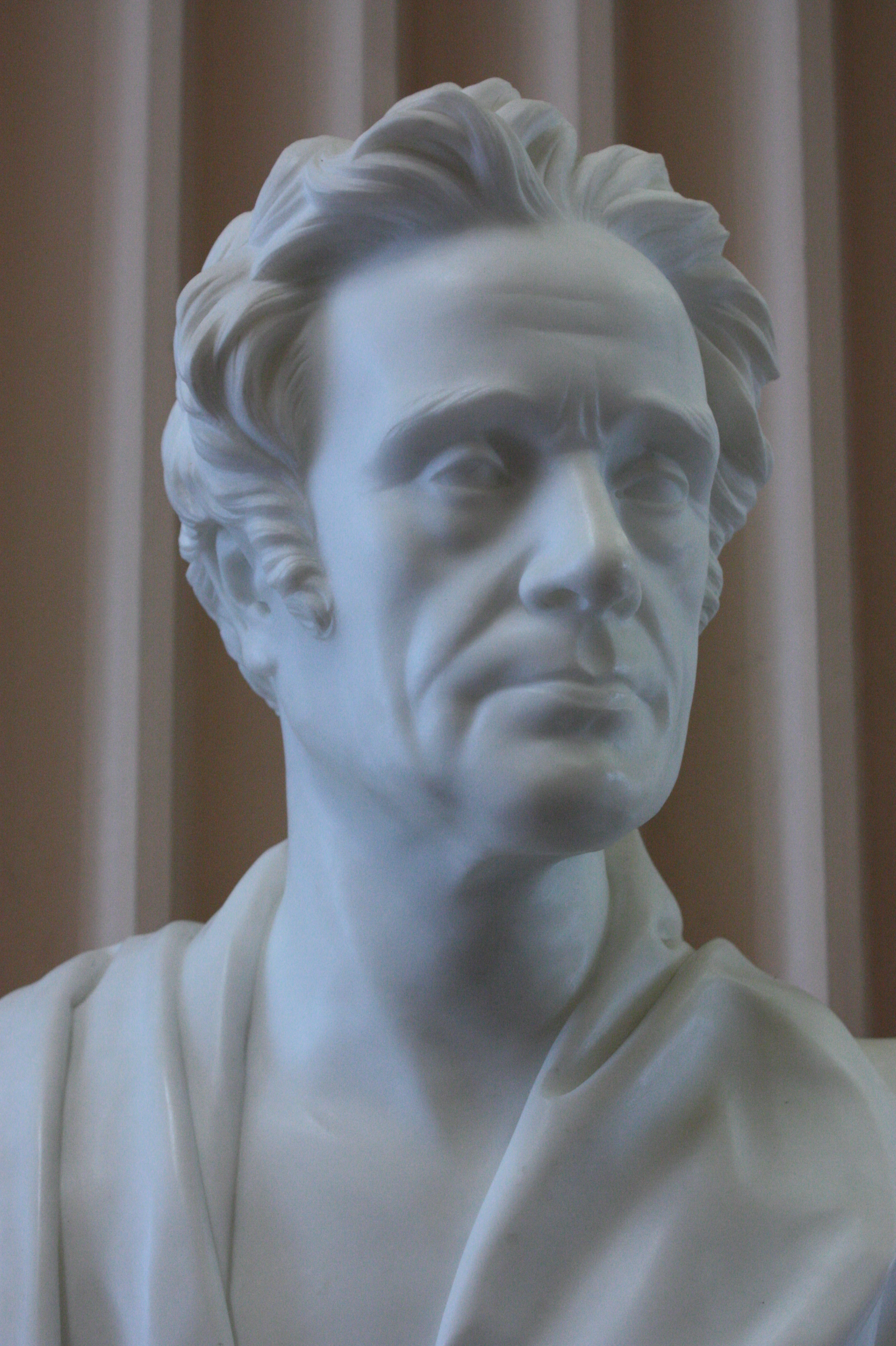
Prof Robert Jameson by Sir John Steell

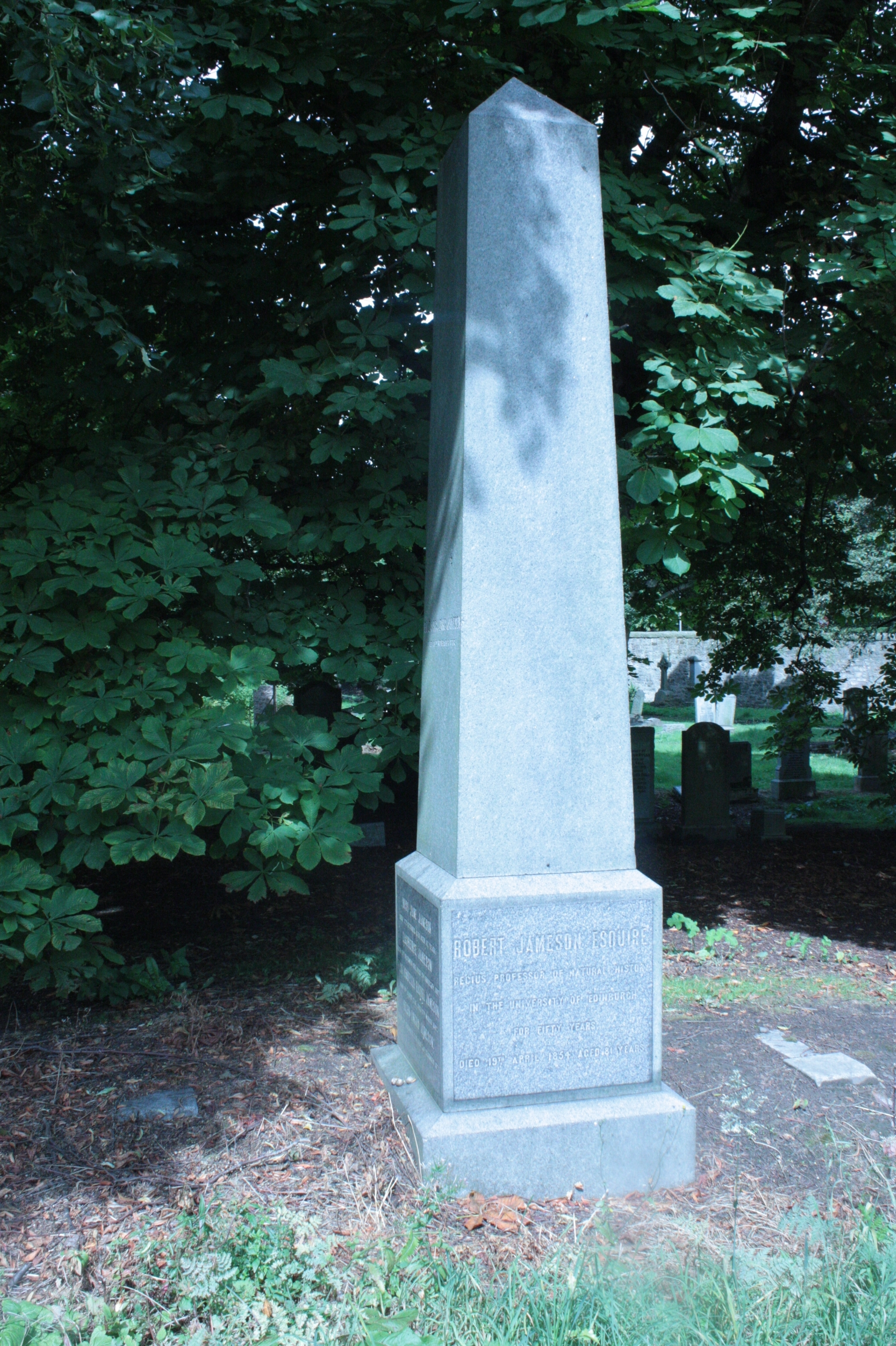
Prof Robert Jameson's grave, Warriston Cemetery

Robert Jameson FRS FRSE (11 July 1774 – 19 April 1854) was a Scottish naturalist and mineralogist.

As Regius Professor of Natural History at the University of Edinburgh for fifty years, developing his predecessor John Walker's concepts based on mineralogy into geological theories of Neptunism which held sway into the 1830s. Jameson is notable for his advanced scholarship, and his museum collection. The minerals and fossils collection of the Museum of Edinburgh University became one of the largest in Europe during Jameson's long tenure at the university.

== Early life ==
Jameson was born in Leith on 11 July 1774, the son of Catherine Paton (1750–94) and Thomas Jameson (c.1750–1802), a soap manufacturer on Rotten Row (now Water Street). They lived on Sherrif Brae. His early education was spent at Leith Grammar School, after which he became the apprentice of the Leith surgeon John Cheyne (father of John Cheyne), with the aim of going to sea. He made his first trip to Shetland to study its geology in 1789, aged only 15, publishing his findings in 1793.

He attended classes at the University of Edinburgh (1792–93), studying medicine, botany, chemistry, and natural history. His father's brother Robert Jameson, was also a physician and lived with them on Rotten Row.

By 1793, influenced by the Regius Professor of Natural History, John Walker (1731–1803), Jameson abandoned medicine and the idea of being a ship's surgeon, and focused instead on science, particularly geology and mineralogy. It is worth noting that Walker was a presbyterian Minister who had actually combined the Regius Professorship with a period of service as Moderator of the General Assembly of the Church of Scotland in 1790.

In 1793, Jameson was given the responsibility of looking after the University's Natural History Collection. During this time his geological field-work frequently took him to the Isle of Arran, the Hebrides, Orkney, the Shetland Islands and the Irish mainland. In 1800, he spent a year at the mining academy in Freiberg, Saxony, where he studied under the noted geologist Abraham Gottlob Werner (1749 or 1750–1817).

As an undergraduate, Jameson had several noteworthy classmates at the University of Edinburgh including Robert Brown, Joseph Black, and Thomas Dick.

In 1799 he was elected a Fellow of the Royal Society of Edinburgh. His proposers were Andrew Coventry, Thomas Charles Hope and Andrew Duncan.

== Regius Professor of Natural History, University of Edinburgh ==
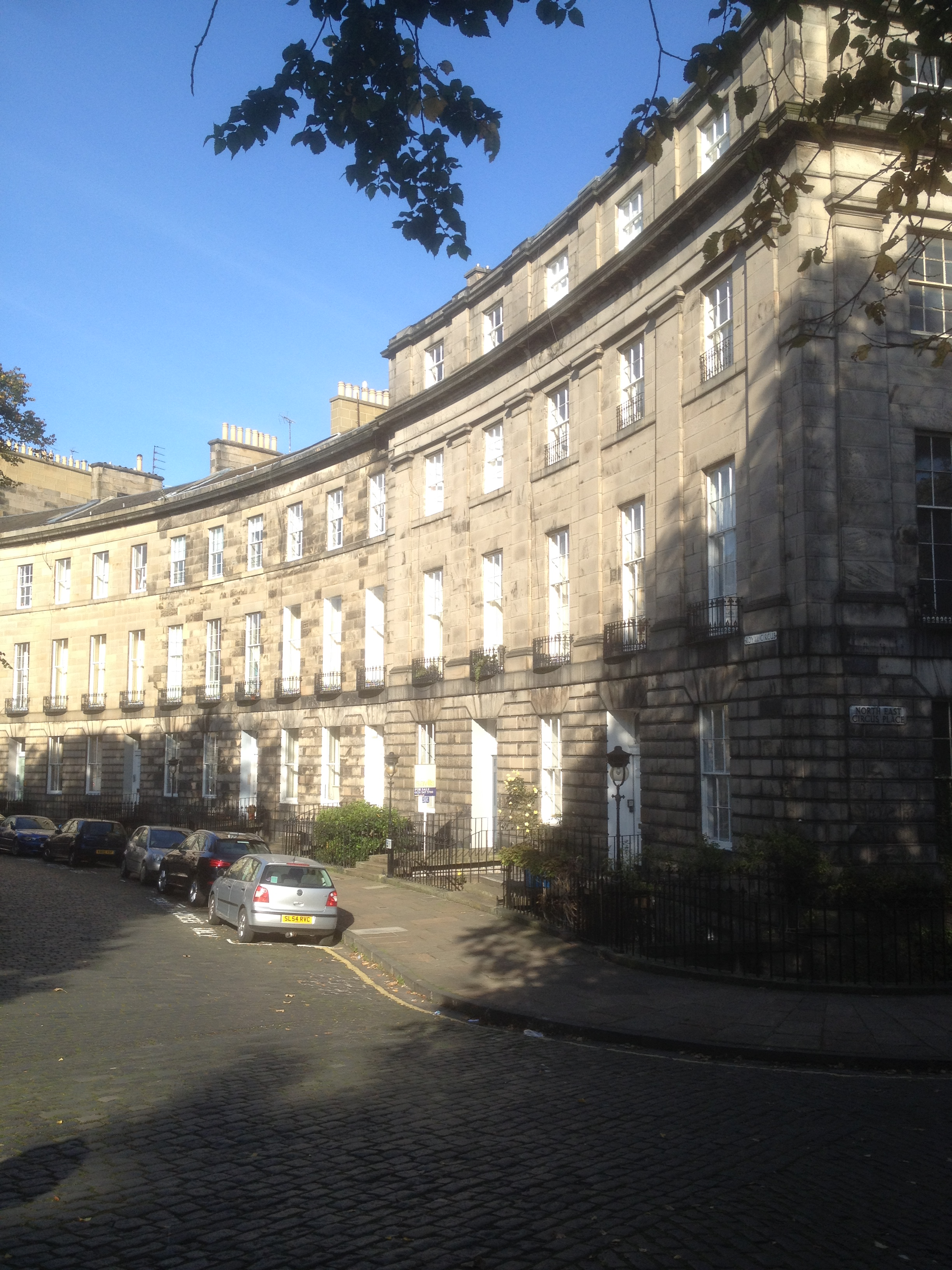
21,22 Royal Circus Edinburgh

In 1804, Jameson succeeded Dr Walker as the third Regius Professor of Natural History at the University of Edinburgh, a post which he held for fifty years. During this period he became the first eminent exponent in Britain of the Wernerian geological system, or Neptunism, and the acknowledged leader of the Scottish Wernerians, founding the Wernerian Natural History Society in 1808 and presiding from 1808 until around 1850, when his health began to decline, together with the fortunes of the Society. Jameson's support for Neptunism, a theory that argued that all rocks had been deposited from a primaeval ocean, initially pitted him against James Hutton (1726–1797), a fellow Scot and eminent geologist also based in Edinburgh (but not in the university), who argued for the uniformitarian deistic concept of Plutonism, that features of the Earth's crust were endlessly recycled in natural processes powered by magmatic molten rocks.

Later, Jameson was willing to join forces with the proponents of Hutton, in 1826 writing that "the Wernerian geognostical views and method of investigation, combined with the theory of Hutton; the experiments and speculations of Hall; the illustrations of Playfair", had taken root in Edinburgh and spread to give Britain unsurpassed success in geology.

In the April–October 1826 edition of the quarterly Edinburgh New Philosophical Journal edited by Jameson, an anonymous paper praised "Mr. Lamarck, one of the most sagacious naturalists of our day" for having "expressed himself in the most unambiguous manner. He admits, on the one hand, the existence of the simplest infusory animals; on the other, the existence of the simplest worms, by means of spontaneous generation, that is, by an aggregation process of animal elements; and maintains, that all other animals, by the operation of external circumstances, are evolved from these in a double series, and in a gradual manner." – this was the first use of the word "evolved" in a modern sense, and was the first significant statement to relate Lamarckism to the geological record of living organisms of the past. Attribution has been disputed, the concepts point to Jameson as the author, combining the directional geological history of Earth proposed by Neptunism with progressive transformism (transmutation of species) shown by fossils. It is possible that the article was written by one of his students, Ami Boué or Robert Edmond Grant. Jameson's references to the Deluge in notes to his translation of Georges Cuvier's Essay on the Theory of the Earth had done much to foster Catastrophism, but his 1827 edition referred to a "succession of variations" caused by environmental conditions having "gradually conducted the classes of aquatic animals to their present state". and a later chapter described how "like the formation of rocks, we observe a regular succession of organic formations, the later always descending from the earlier, down to the present inhabitants of the earth, and to the last created being who was to exercise dominion over them", summarising elements of the ideas of Giambattista Brocchi.

As a teacher, Jameson had a mixed reputation for imparting enthusiasm to his students. Thomas Carlyle, who gave serious attention to Natural History, described Jameson's lecturing style as a "blizzard of facts". Charles Darwin attended Robert Jameson's natural history course at the University of Edinburgh in Darwin's teenage years. Darwin found the lectures boring, saying that they determined him "never to attend to the study of geology". The detailed syllabus of Jameson's lectures, as drawn up by him in 1826, shows the range of his teaching. The course in zoology began with a consideration of the natural history of human beings, and concluded with lectures on the philosophy of zoology, in which the first subject was Origin of the Species of Animals. (The Scotsman, 29 October 1935: p. 8).

Over Jameson's fifty-year tenure, he built up a huge collection of mineralogical and geological specimens for the Museum of Edinburgh University, including fossils, birds and insects. By 1852 there were over 74,000 zoological and geological specimens at the museum, and in Britain the natural history collection was second only to that of the British Museum. Shortly after his death, the University Museum was transferred to the British Crown and became part of the Royal Scottish Museum, now the Royal Museum, in Edinburgh's Chambers Street. He was also a prolific author of scientific papers and books, including the Mineralogy of the Scottish Isles (1800), his System of Mineralogy (1804), which ran to three editions, and Manual of Mineralogy (1821). In 1819, with Sir David Brewster (1781–1868), Jameson started the Edinburgh Philosophical Journal and became its sole editor in 1824.

He died at his home, 21 Royal Circus in Edinburgh, on 19 April 1854 after two years of illness, and was interred at Warriston Cemetery. He lies on the north side of the main east–west path near the old East Gate. He was succeeded in his post at Edinburgh University by Prof Edward Forbes.

== Publications ==
- Mineralogy of the Island of Arran and the Shetland Isles (1798)
- Mineralogy of the Scottish Isles (1800)
- Mineralogical Description of Scotland (1804)
- A Mineralogical Description of the County of Dumfries (1805)
- System of Mineralogy, with expanded editions in 1816 and 1820. Published in three volumes. Jameson says in Volume One on preface page xvii: "I shall follow the arrangement and method of description of Werner" in his system of mineralogy.*System of Mineralogy (1806)
- Characters of Minerals (1806)
- Elements of Geognosy (1809)
- Translation of the Travels of Von Buch through Norway and Lapland (1813)
- Translation of Cuvier's Essay on the Theory of the Earth (1813)
- Mineralogical Travels through the Hebrides, Orkney and Shetland Islands (1813)
- A Manual of Minerals and Mountain Rocks (1821)
- Manual of Mineralogy (1821)
- (With James Wilson and Hugh Murray). Narrative of Discovery and Adventure in Africa, from the Earliest Ages to the Present Time: with illustrations of the geology, mineralogy, and zoology. With a map; plans of the routes of Park, and of Denham and Clapperton; several engravings. First published in the Edinburgh Cabinet Library (1830)

== Students of note ==
- Dr Ami Boué
- Charles Daubeny
- Samuel Hibbert-Ware
- Charles Darwin

== Artistic recognition ==
A portrait of Robert Jameson by George Watson is housed by the National Portrait Gallery in London, and a bust of him is in the Old College of the University of Edinburgh.

== Family ==
Jameson never married and had no children.

He was the uncle of Robert William Jameson, Writer to the Signet and playwright of Edinburgh, and therefore also the great-uncle of Sir Leander Starr Jameson, Bt, KCMG, British colonial statesman.

His sister Janet Jameson (1776-1853) married Patrick Torrie (1763-1810). They were parents to Thomas Jameson Torrie FRSE a geologist.

A further nephew was William Jameson FRSE who rose to fame in India.

A species of venomous snake, Dendroaspis jamesoni, is named in honor of Robert Jameson.

A geological landmark in Newfoundland, Canada is named in his honour - Jameson Hills - named by a former student of his Wm. Eppes Cormack - the first European to traverse the interior of the island of Newfoundland
