= Werner's Nomenclature of Colours =

1814 book of colour samples

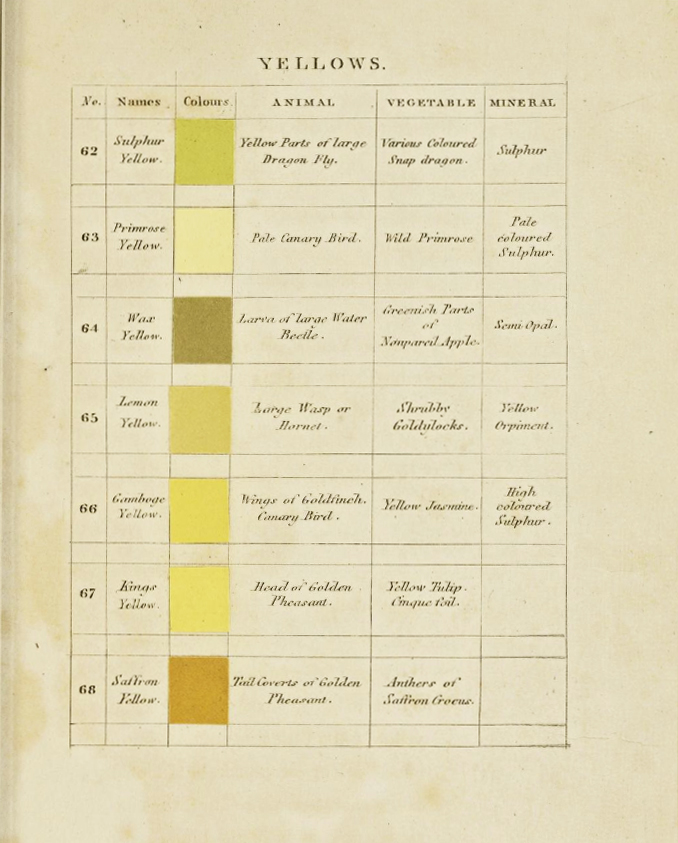
Werner's yellow

Werner's Nomenclature of Colours (1814/1821) is an illustrated colour manual authored by Scottish botanical illustrator Patrick Syme. Containing painted colour swatches, the book was based on the colour system compiled by mineralogist Abraham Gottlob Werner. First published in 1814, Werner's Nomenclature contained 108 of the most commonly occurring colours in the natural world, accompanied by animal, vegetable and mineral examples of each colour. The book appeared in a second edition in 1821, which was the edition used by Charles Darwin in his scientific observations on the voyage of HMS Beagle. Syme's nomenclature was the preferred colour vocabulary among a large number of naturalists in the first half of the nineteenth century, especially as an apparatus for documenting colour in the field. The publication was also influential among nineteenth-century colour theorists, artists and decorators, and can be viewed as a predecessor of modern named colour systems such as Pantone. The colours are illustrated and described, and examples are paired with those found in the animal, vegetable and mineral kingdoms in Nature's Palette by Patrick Baty.
