= Robert William Jameson =

British journalist (1805–1868)

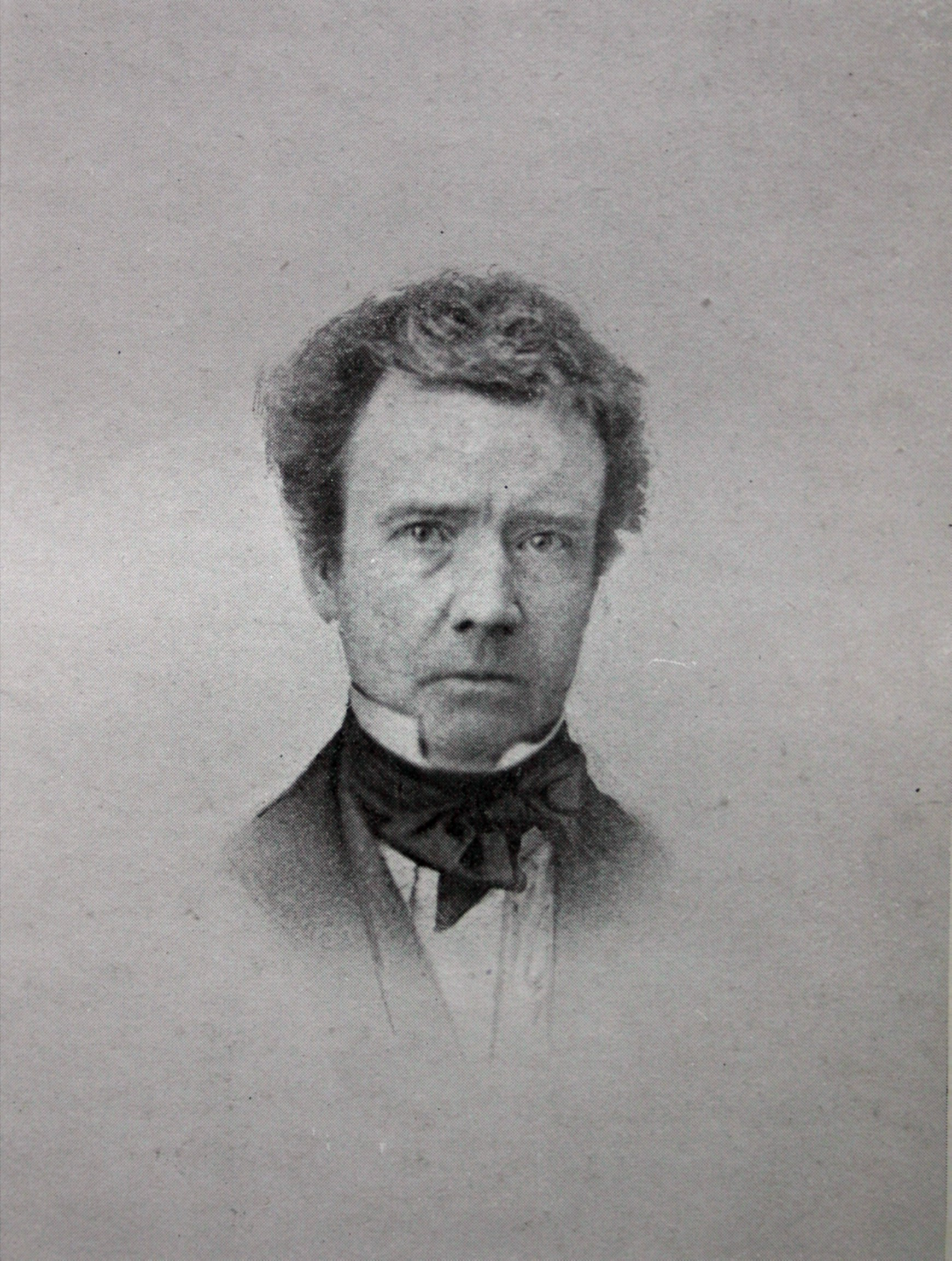
Robert William Jameson

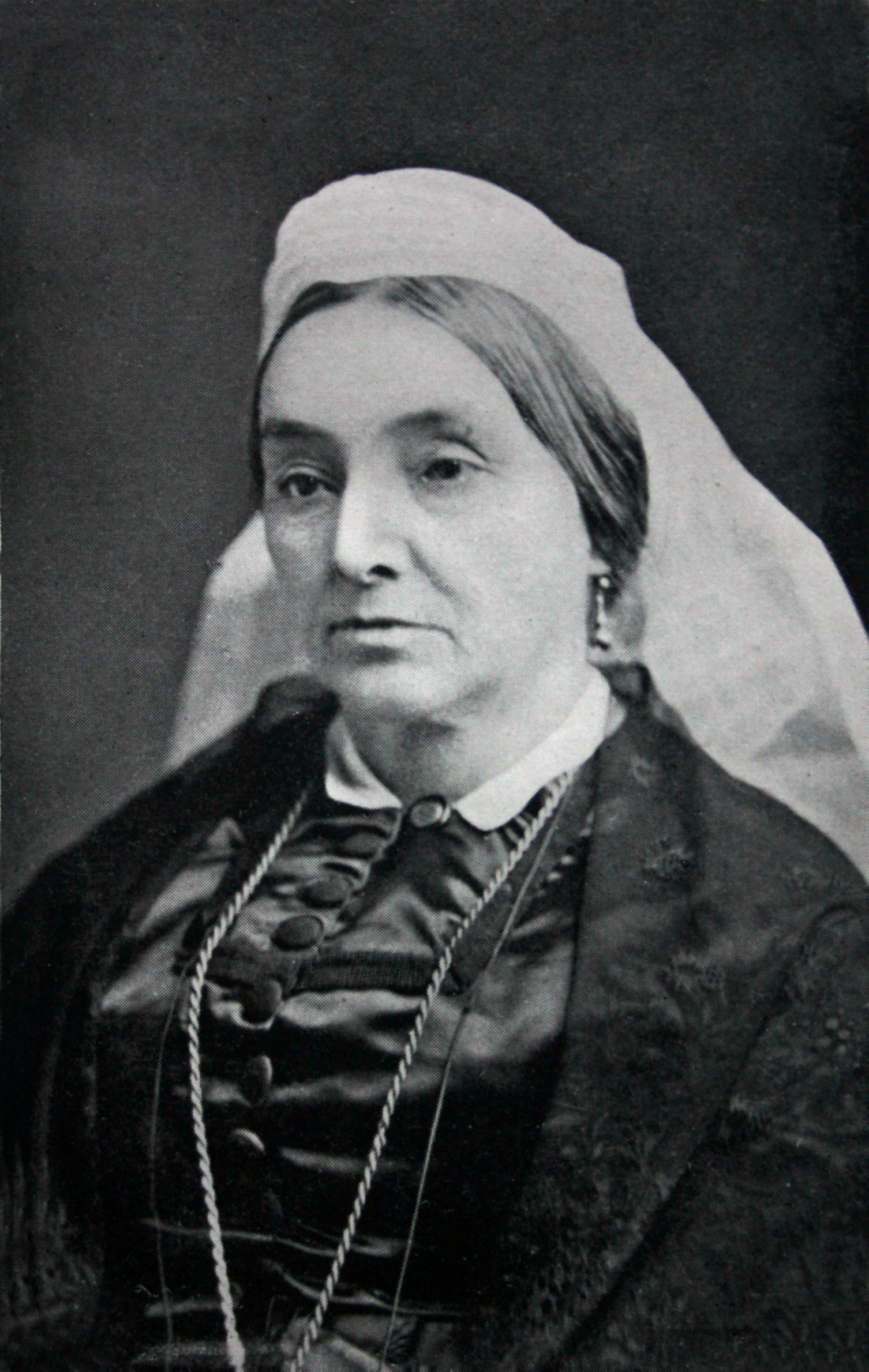
Christian Pringle

Robert William Jameson, WS (27 September 1805 – 10 December 1868), was a Scottish Writer to the Signet in Edinburgh, Town Councillor, newspaper editor, poet and playwright. He was the father of Sir Leander Starr Jameson, South African statesman and prime minister, and the nephew of Professor Robert Jameson of the University of Edinburgh. Born in Edinburgh in 1805, Robert William was the son of Thomas Jameson, a wealthy shipowner, merchant and burgess of the city of Edinburgh, as recorded in Colvin, Vol. 1: 1-2 (1922). Colvin writes of Robert William's father and grandfather, both of whom were named Thomas Jameson, that:

"These Jamesons came, so the tradition goes, from the Shetland Islands; and both their origin and their crest, a ship in full sail, with Sine Metu for motto, suggest that they once followed a seafaring life. But they had been long settled in Leith and Edinburgh." (Colvin, 1922, Vol.1:1).

In 1835 Robert William Jameson married Christian Pringle, daughter of Major-General Pringle of Symington and his wife Christian Watson. The Jamesons had eleven children, of whom Leander Starr was the youngest, born on 9 February 1853.

Having first pursued a career as a Writer to the Signet in Edinburgh, Robert William's interest in journalism was recognised by his Whig friend and patron the Earl of Stair, who in 1854 made him Editor of the Wigtownshire Free Press, the headquarters of which was based in Stranraer, to which the family moved from Edinburgh, remaining there until 1860.

Robert William was a radical and free thinker, author of the dramatic poem Nimrod, published in 1848 and of the play Timolean, a tragedy in five acts, published and performed at the Adelphi Theatre in Edinburgh in 1852. Timolean, inspired by liberal anti-slavery views of the era, was popular with audiences and ran to a second edition within the first year of publication. In 1854 Jameson published the novel The Curse of Gold.

Writing for The Scotsman in 1922, W.Forbes Gray observed of Robert William Jameson that:

"There was probably no better known man in Edinburgh in the earlier part of the last century than Robert William Jameson, W.S., the father of the South African statesman whose biography is reviewed in your columns to-day. When the agitation for Parliamentary and municipal reform was at its height, Jameson, who was a sturdy Radical and a violent opponent of the Corn Law, ranged himself alongside of Adam Black, and was able as well as indefatigable in his advocacy of the policy of the 'clean slate'. Lord Chancellor Campbell considered Jameson the best hustings speaker he ever heard. Jameson was prominent at most of the public meetings of that time, and when the citizens of Edinburgh gave their feelings over the rejection of the first Reform Bill by the House of Lords, Jameson was one of the speakers at a mass meeting in the King's Park, attended by about 50,000 people. He was also an ardent municipal reformer, and was among those chosen at the first election of the reformed Town Council of Edinburgh. In 1835 Councillor Jameson opposed a proposal that the College Committee of the Town Council should supervise the teaching given in the University."

Robert William and his family moved to Chelsea and Kensington in London in 1861, where he died in 1868.
