= Middleton Jameson =

Scottish artist (1851–1919)

Middleton Alexander Jameson (1851–1919) was a Scottish artist, born in Edinburgh. One of the older brothers of Sir Leander Starr Jameson, British South African statesman, notable for his leadership of the Jameson Raid. Born in 1851, Middleton died on 22 April 1919. Middleton was affectionately called 'Midge' by his family; in his latter years he lived in London at 2, Cumberland Place with two of his brothers: Sam and Leander Starr.

== Life ==
A late Victorian and Edwardian artist, active in production from around 1877–1919, Jameson painted naturalistic scenes, capturing fine detail in both indoor and external settings. Middleton's primary artistic medium was oil on canvas. His portrait of his brother Leander is in the Primary Collection of the National Portrait Gallery in London.

== Paintings ==
- A Mother With Her Daughters in the Kitchen Garden (1883: oil on canvas)
- Thirsty (1883: oil on canvas)
- La Fille Pêcheur (1887: oil on canvas)
- Sir Leander Starr Jameson, Bt (oil on canvas, Primary Collection of the UK National Portrait Gallery in London)
- Encontre Avec Son Premier Amour (1881: oil on canvas)
- Collecting Rushes (1881:oil on canvas)
- Cupid and Psyche (1989:oil on canvas)
- At the Piano, (1877, oil on canvas)
