= Patrick Syme =

Scottish painter (1774–1845)

- Born: 17 September 1774; Edinburgh, Scotland
- Died: 25 July 1845 (aged 70); Dollar, Scotland
- Relatives: John Syme, nephew

Patrick Syme (17 September 1774 – 25 July 1845) was a Scottish flower-painter.

== Life ==
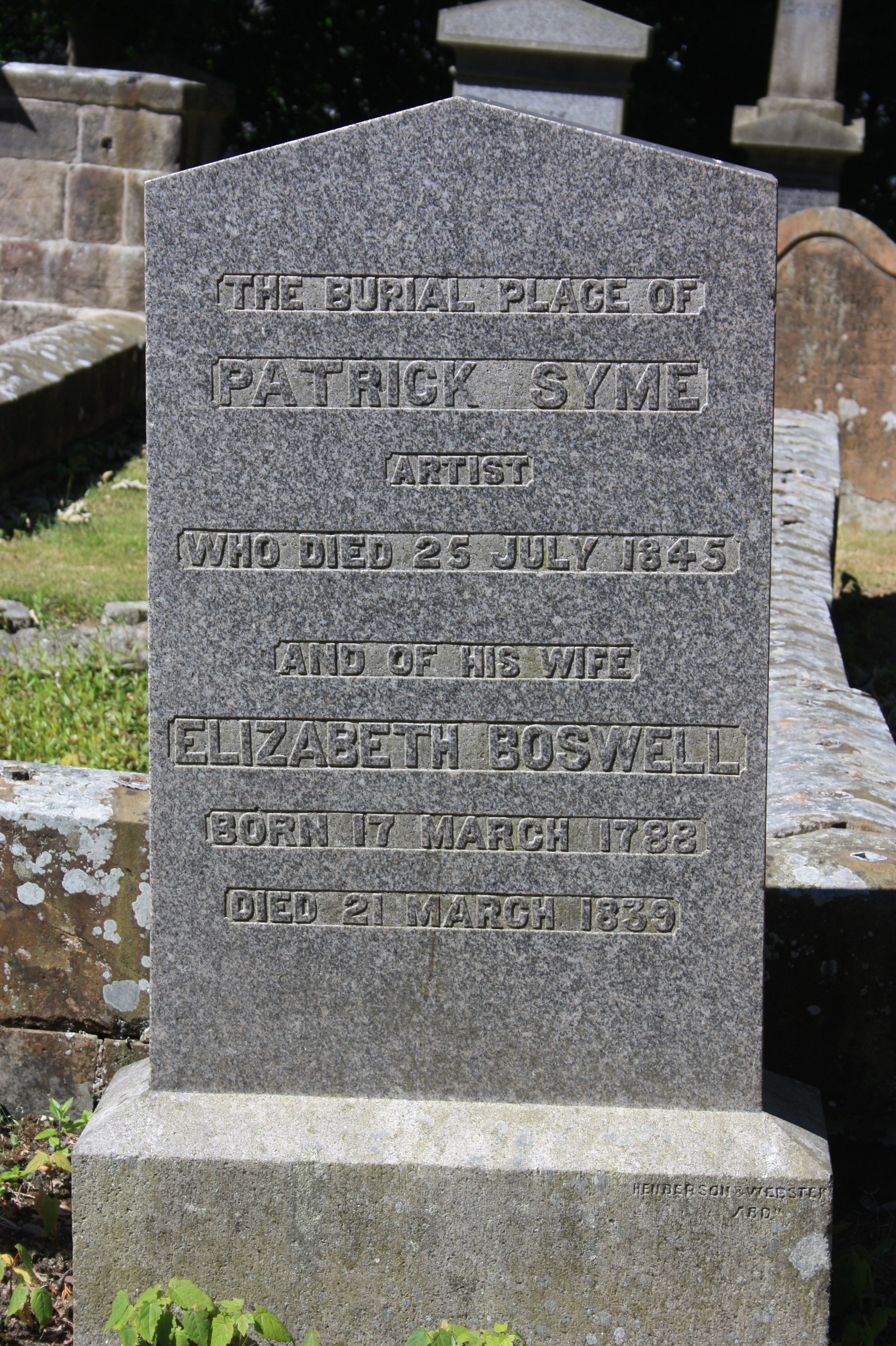
The grave of Patrick Syme, Dollar

Syme was born in Edinburgh on 17 September 1774, and educated there. In the Scottish public exhibitions, which began in 1808, his flower-pieces were much admired.

In 1803 Syme took up his brother's practice as a drawing-master, and concentrated on teaching. He was one of the associate artist members of the Royal Institution. He was also prominent in the foundation of the Royal Scottish Academy, occupying the chair at the first meeting in May 1826, and becoming one of the council of four appointed there to manage its affairs.

Towards the end of his life Syme was art master at Dollar Academy. He died at Dollar, Clackmannanshire, in July 1845. He is buried in the parish churchyard the grave lying in the upper north-west section.

== Works ==
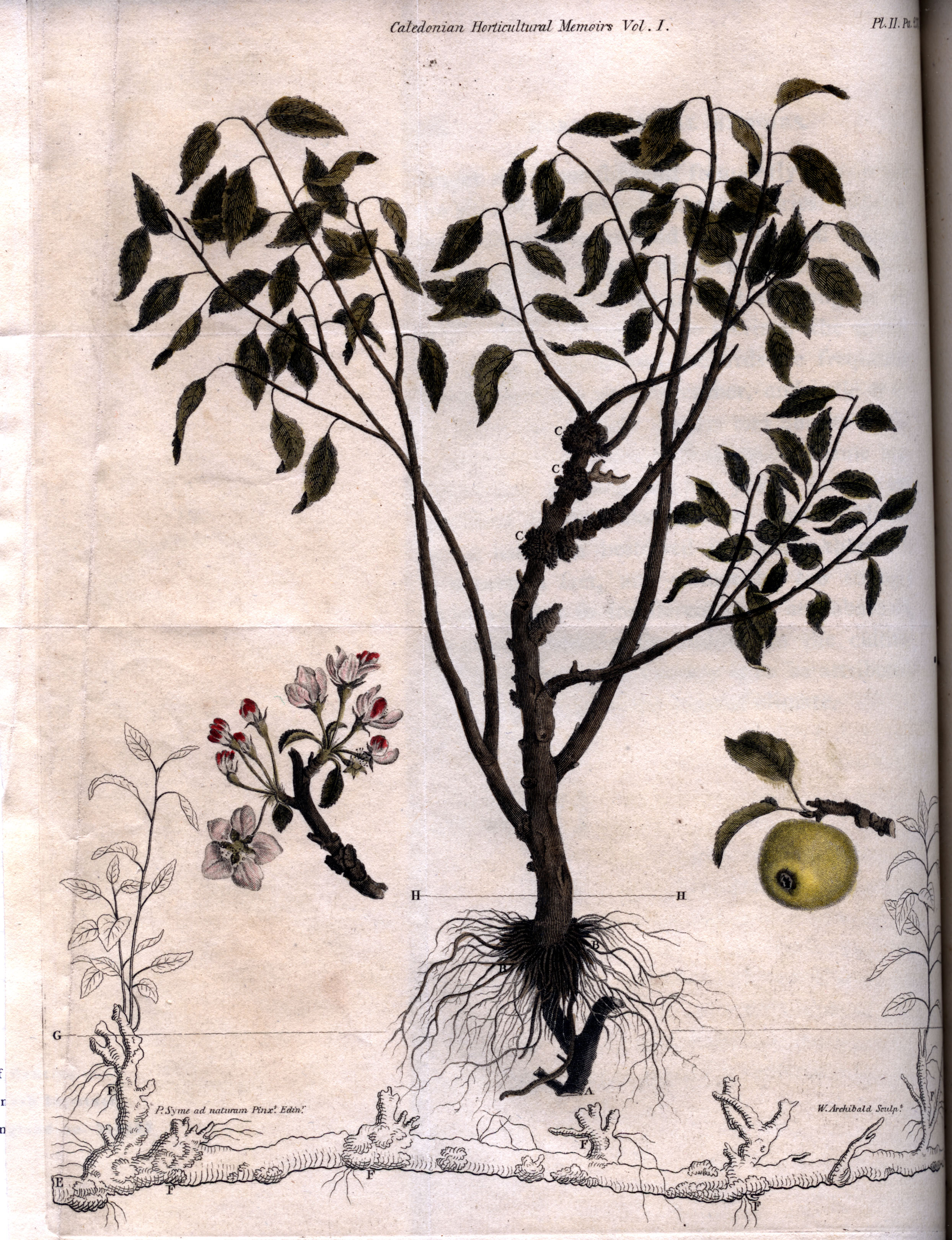
Apple tree, engraving after Patrick Syme

If best known as a flower-painter, Syme painted portraits and made technical drawings for natural history publications. He authored three publications:

- Practical Directions for Learning Flower Drawing (1810)
- A translation of Abraham Gottlob Werner's Nomenclature of Colours (1814)
- Treatise on British Song Birds (1823)

His most famous work was Werner's Nomenclature of Colours (1814), which was influential among nineteenth-century naturalists. Charles Darwin took a copy on the HMS Beagle and used it throughout the voyage to describe the colours of natural history specimens in his notes.

== Family ==
Syme married Elizabeth Boswell of Balmuto daughter of Claud Irvine Boswell, Lord Balmuto, the judge. She had been his pupil since about 1810, the couple eloped in 1822, and her family's disapproval of the match was permanent. John Thomas Irvine Boswell the botanist was their son.
