= Plutonism =

Geological theory

Plutonism is the geologic theory that the igneous rocks forming the Earth originated from intrusive magmatic activity, with a continuing gradual process of weathering and erosion wearing away rocks, which were then deposited on the sea bed, re-formed into layers of sedimentary rock by heat and pressure, and raised again. It proposes that basalt is solidified molten magma. The theory lead to plutonic (intrinsic) rock classification, which includes intrinsic igneous rocks such as gabbro, diorite, granite and pegmatite. The name plutonism references Pluto, the classical ruler of the underworld and the Roman god of wealth. A main reason Pluto was incorporated into the classification was due to the plutonic rocks commonly being present in gold and silver ore deposits (veins).

The Oxford English Dictionary traces use of the word "plutonists" to 1799, and the appearance of the word plutonism to 1842.

Abbé Anton Moro, who had studied volcanic islands, first proposed the theory before 1750, and James Hutton subsequently developed it as part of his Theory of the Earth, published in 1788, which used rock formations at Glen Tilt in Perthshire as the prime example supporting his theory; an example used by Neptunism to prove their theory as well. The idea contested Abraham Werner's neptunist theory which proposed that the Earth had formed from a mass of water and suspended material which had formed rocks as layers of deposited sediment which became the continents when the water retreated, further layers being deposited by floods and some volcanic activity.

Plutonists strongly disputed the neptunist view that rocks had formed by processes that no longer operated, instead supporting Hutton's theory. A key issue of the debate revolved around the neptunist belief that basalt was sedimentary, and some fossils had been found in it. Against this, Hutton's supporter John Playfair (1748–1819) argued that this rock contained no fossils as it had formed from molten magma, and it had been found cutting through other rocks in volcanic dykes. The arguments continued into the early 19th century, and eventually the plutonist views on the origin of rocks prevailed in the wake of the work of Charles Lyell in the 1830s, who incorporated this theory into uniformitarianism. However, geologists regard sedimentary rocks such as limestone as having resulted from processes like those described by the neptunists.

Comparatively, plutonism within uniformitarianism is equivalent to neptunism within catastrophism, as both are used as core concepts within their respective theories, and hence similarly, neptunism opposes plutonism in the same way that catastrophism opposes uniformitarianism.

== Ideology ==
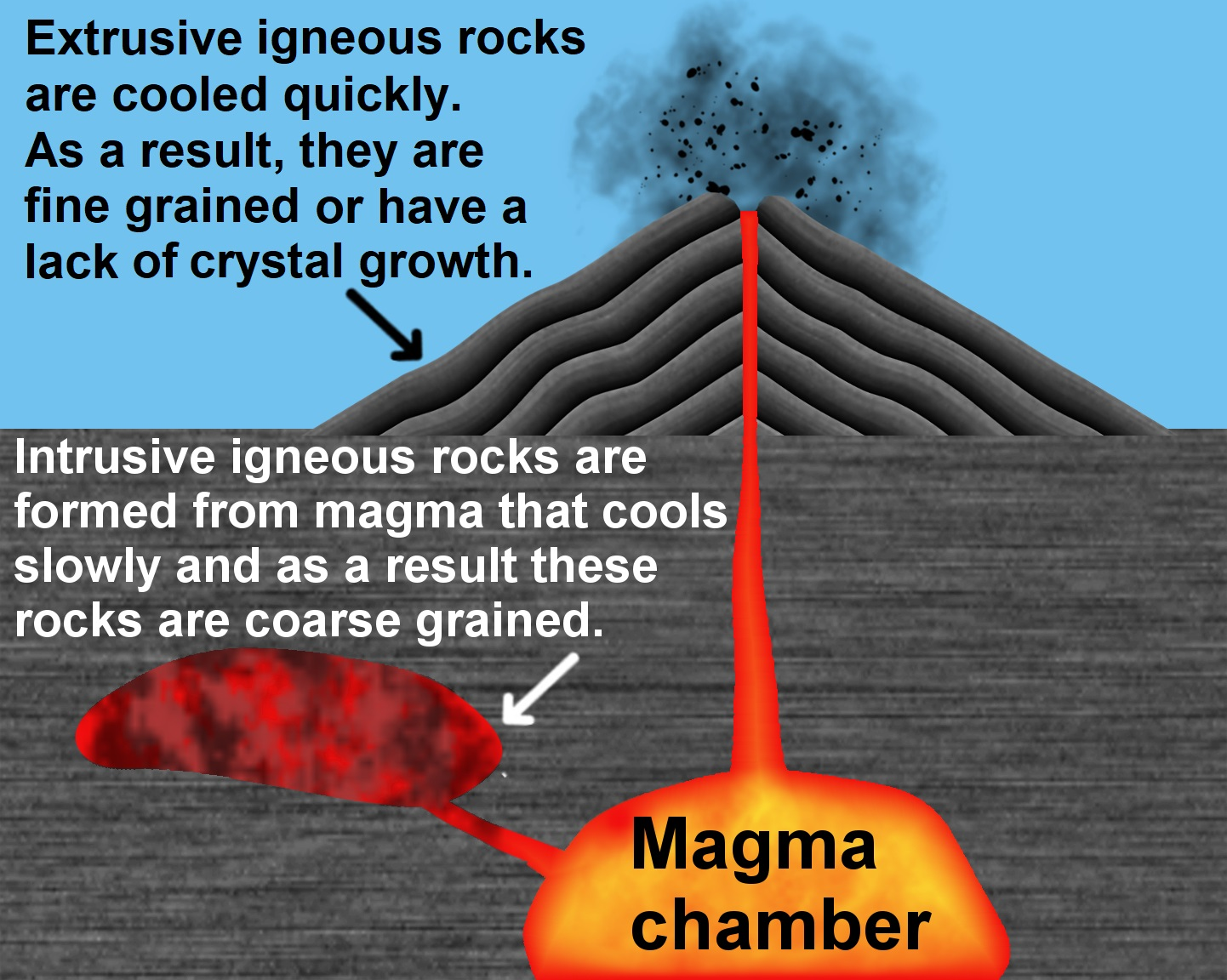
Image depicts the difference in location and result of extrusive and intrusive igneous rocks

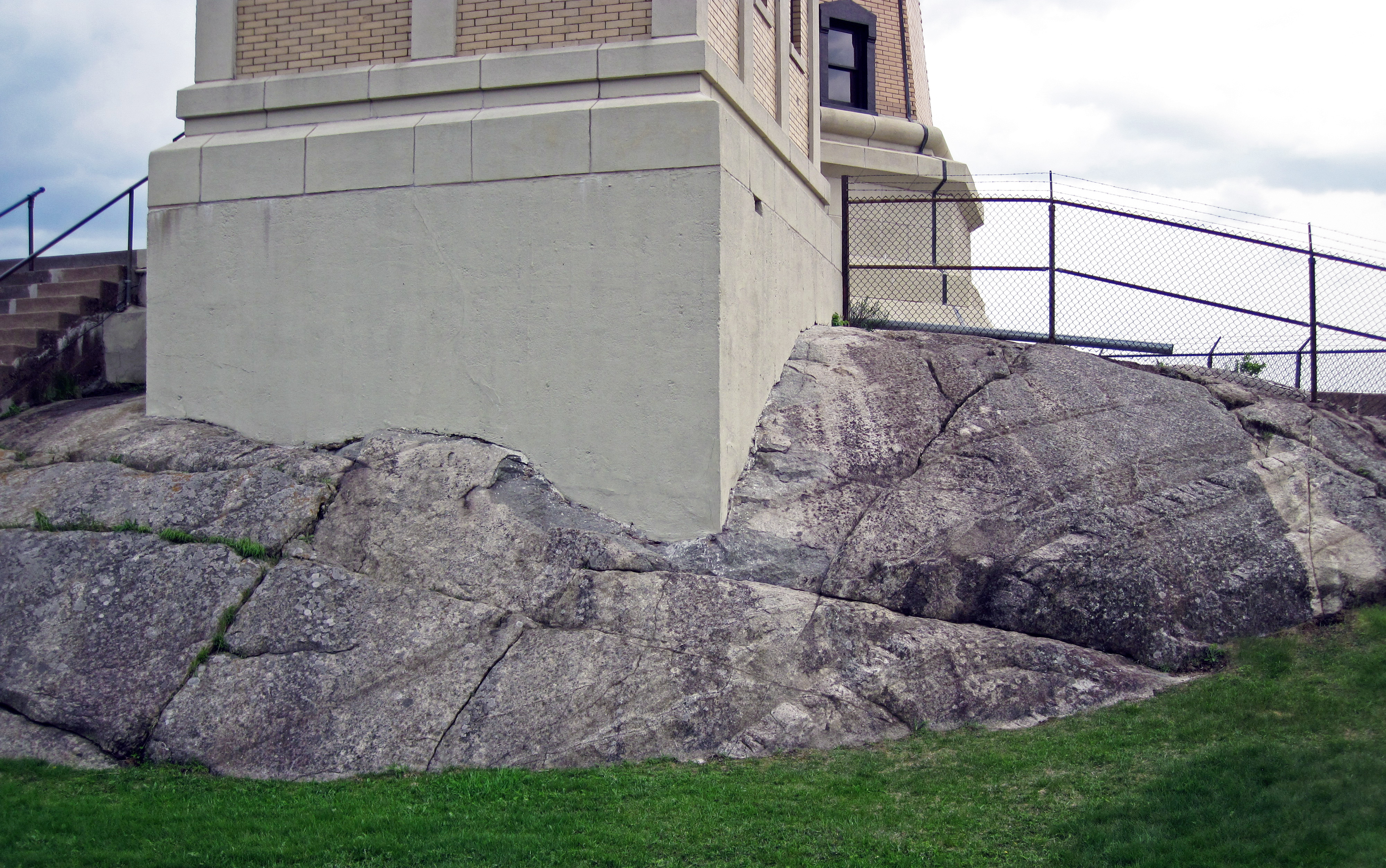
Image depicts Anorthosite at the base of a structure; a type of plutonic rock

Plutonism is a geological theory proposed by James Hutton, where he proposed that the main cause of the current arrangement of rocks and the Earth's surface landscape was driven through the heat provided by magma concealed within surface of the Earth, which occurred over the course of thousands if not millions of years. This process is influenced by the production of magma.

The process of magma production occurs during the process of mountain formation in which two specific locations where magma would be generated. The first involves high-grade metamorphism occurring within “thickened continental crust” resulting in granitic magma, hence resulting in a direct formation. The second method involves basaltic magma forming over a larger area, located above the subduction zone, though this magma fails to reach past the base of the continental crust due to its higher density. However, when heat is applied to the crust, an area of granitic magma can be produced through the melting of the continental crust when contributing to metamorphism.

Partial crystallization and magma mixing, among other igneous processes occur once the basaltic magma cools to a sufficient temperature, resulting in the formation of “a more silicic andesite” composition, which is less dense than the original basaltic magma. This allows magma to proceed through the crust, resulting in the occurrence of explosive volcanoes. Volcanic rocks form from the lava cooling on the Earth's surface. However, in the event when the occurrence of subduction or temperature within the magma chamber is insufficient, the magma chamber within the volcano would crystallise, resulting in the extinction of the volcano and the formation of intrusive igneous rock, also referred to as plutonic rocks or “plutons”. In some instances, a separate chamber may crystallise, hence not resulting in the extinction of the volcano. In the event of uplift/erosion mountain building occurs, batholith rocks occur.

Additionally, some of the magma within the Earth is produced without subduction, resulting in the formation of “sticky granite magma”, and is without a conduit to reach the surface. Instead, it forces its way through rock crevices, resulting in a high-pressure environment. Cooling then occurs, over a long period of time, resulting in large coarse-grained crystals which form bodies with distinctive textures, resulting in intrusive igneous/plutonic rocks. These rocks vary in size and colour.

== Historical development ==
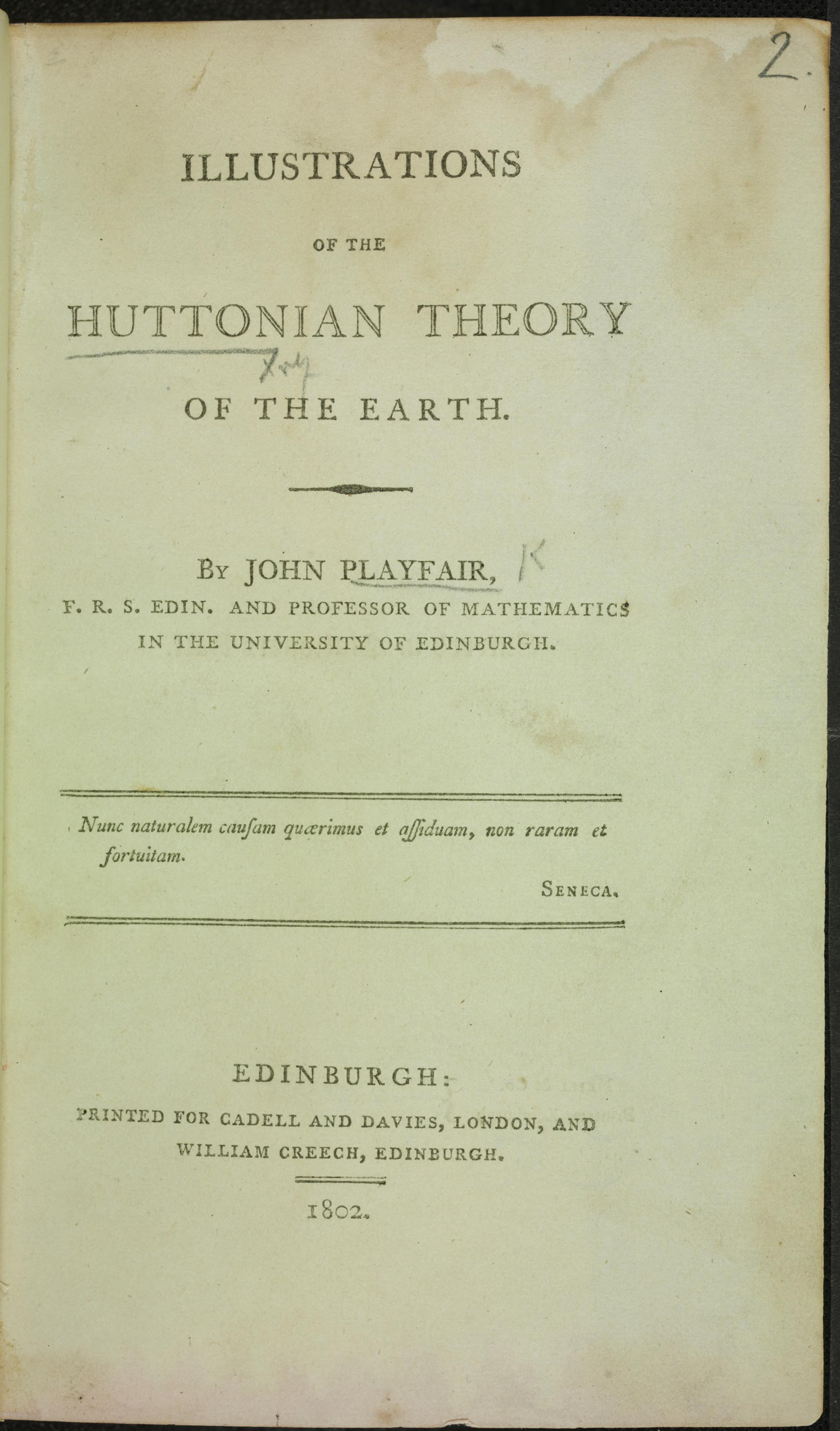
Image depicts the front page of John Playfair's Illustrations of Huttonian Theory

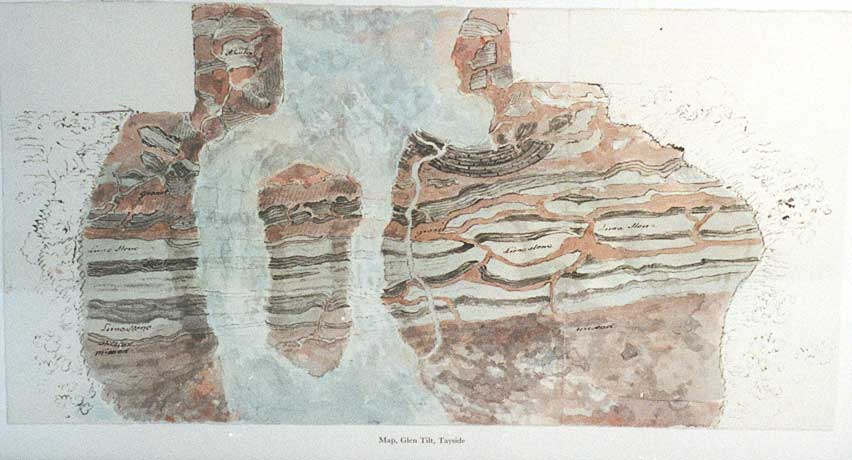
Image depicts rock face used by Hutton to explain his theory of plutonism

During the 18th century scientists enquired about the process and context in which the current rock landscape on the Earth's surface came into existence and why it was in the current arrangement. From this enquiry came about two prevailing theories: plutonism, which was proposed by James Hutton, and neptunism, which was proposed by Abraham Gottlob Werner. It has been noted within the scientific community that they were not the first ones to propose such theories, but they were the ones credited with proposing their corresponding theories to the scientific community.

One of the first notable scientists to propose an early theory of plutonism was Abbé Anton Moro, who in the first half of the 18th century was able to inform the scientific community how to differentiate between volcanic and sedimentary rocks. Through observing crustaceans, it led him to discover that within mountains lied petrified fossils. This suggested to him that at one point in the past, through the force of volcanic fire, islands and continents rose from the bottom of the sea. He argued that this occurred over a long period of time as opposed to a relatively short amount of time, indicating some sort of continuous change that has and is occurring on the Earth’s surface, leading to the current formations viewed by humanity.

In the 1780s, Hutton started opposing the neptunist view of previous catastrophic events being the cause of the current landscape, with no modern equivalency. Hutton proposed the Earth was undergoing a slow but continuous changes, where such changes on the Earth namely occur through volcanism, erosion, transportation and deposition of sediments. He used the Glen Tilt of Perthshire as evidence to support his argument, where the used location was used as an example of the neptunist theory prior to his hypothesis of the granite present there. He published his theory and findings in an essay in 1788, which was followed by his two-volume work tilted Theory of the Earth in 1795, which expanded upon his 1788 work.

In 1802, Illustrations of the Huttonian Theory was published by John Playfair, which attempted to siphon the influence of Neptunism at the time. The Illustrations portrayed Hutton's “length and obscurely written book” in a concise, clear manner, “keeping Hutton's approach alive” following his death in 1797, as other scientists interpreted his theory in their own manner. Additionally, John Playfair would argue Plutonism being the correct theory as opposed to Neptunism.

In 1830, a scientist named Charles Lyell, founded uniformitarianism. In 1830, Lyell published the Principles of Geology, in which the Earth is an equilibrium state, where biological, chemical and physical processes have occurred slowly over an extreme amount of time, resulting in the observed features on the Earth's surface. The theory included aspects of plutonism as core concepts resulting in the de facto general acceptance of plutonism, as uniformitarianism became widely accepted within the scientific community, resulting in Hutton becoming the “Father of Geology”, due to the presence of Hutton's work as core concepts.

== The plutonist and neptunist schism ==
As mentioned prior, there were two prevailing theories during the 18th century to explain the current arrangement of the landscape and rock formations: plutonism and neptunism. The schism was pseudo-initiated through Moro’s differentiation of sedimentary and volcanic rocks, as well as his theory of volcanic fire lifting the islands and continents, as he argued it was a slow process, whilst others argued it was catastrophic and had no modern equivalences. Neptunists believed that the Earth's surface initially only contained a turbid ocean, which led to deposits of sediments on the ocean resulting in the formation of crystalline rocks such as granites. There were many opposing views between the two theories, one of the more notable oppositions of each theory was the formation of granite. Hutton believed that the granites were injected within the Glen Tilt of Perthshire as they were intruded through Dalradian metasediments, indicated by the cut across sediment layers. This indicated to Hutton that the sediments were older than the granite. This contradicted Neptunism, as it believes granites to be precipitated out of the ocean, hence being the oldest rock type.

In 1773, prior to Hutton’s observations, Abraham Gottlob Werner published his mineralogy book On the External Characteristics of Fossils, which categorised minerals through their physical characteristics alone, which allowed him to obtain the position of Curator of Freiberg School of Mining’s mineral collection and teacher of mining, where he was able to promote his theory of neptunism. Through his prestigious position, he attracted many students where he was able to spread neptunism to general scientific community as they entered the field geology and any other connecting fields.

As Hutton died in 1797, plutonism was less vocal within the scientific community at the time as it received scepticism from pro-neptunism individuals. As mentioned above, John Playfair published his Illustrations of Huttonian Theory, which siphoned the influence of neptunism, as Playfair depicted Hutton’s theory in a more concise and clear manner that allowed the presence of plutonism to remain in the opposition of neptunism in the scientific community.

Werner’s theory was developed through his observations of a selected group of rocks, as his position at the university prevented him from make observations and developing his theory on a wider array of rocks. Hence, when other rocks were observed from different parts of the world, conformity to neptunism decreased with each type of rock being examined. This development was noticeable in the work of Alexander von Humboldt (1769–1859), who had studied with Werner in Freiberg and gradually departed from his teacher's theories. Due to this trend, neptunism declined after Werner’s death in 1817, leaving the battle of neptunism and plutonism in a relative stagnation as pro-plutonism and pro-neptunism scientists attempted to ensure their respective theory became accepted. Despite this stalemate, neptunism was partially favoured to plutonism due to Werner’s position allowing him to spread his theory due to a larger degree of individuals within the university and scientific community being influenced by him. Hence, many of his students favoured neptunism over plutonism.

Sometime in the early 19th century, prior to Lyell’s contributions, a French scientist named Georges Cuvier utilised Werner’s neptunism theory within his theory of catastrophism, which had neptunism as a core aspect, similar to how uniformitarianism implemented plutonism as a core aspect. His theory suggested that the Earth’s landscape has come to be through volatile forces that the Earth system possess that come in and out of existence. This theory was favoured by the scientific community at the time, and hence, neptunism by default was still maintaining its dominance over plutonism.

However, the schism ended through Lyell's book Principles of Geology published in 1830, resulting in the formation of uniformitarianism, which incorporated Hutton's ideas of plutonism. His findings, claims and ideas were accepted by the general scientific community, hence resulting in the end of the schism, and resulting in the general acceptance of plutonism over neptunism.

== Notable plutonists ==
- Abbé Anton Moro: he was the first to differentiate volcanic and sedimentary rocks, in addition to being the first to propose the occurrence of the raising of islands and continents through volcanic fire over a long period of time, hence initiating the discussion of plutonism and neptunism as Werner would purpose a theory that directly opposed his own at a much later date, which Hutton would oppose later on. Additionally, he initiated the theory of plutonism in modern science, which Hutton formally proposed later on.

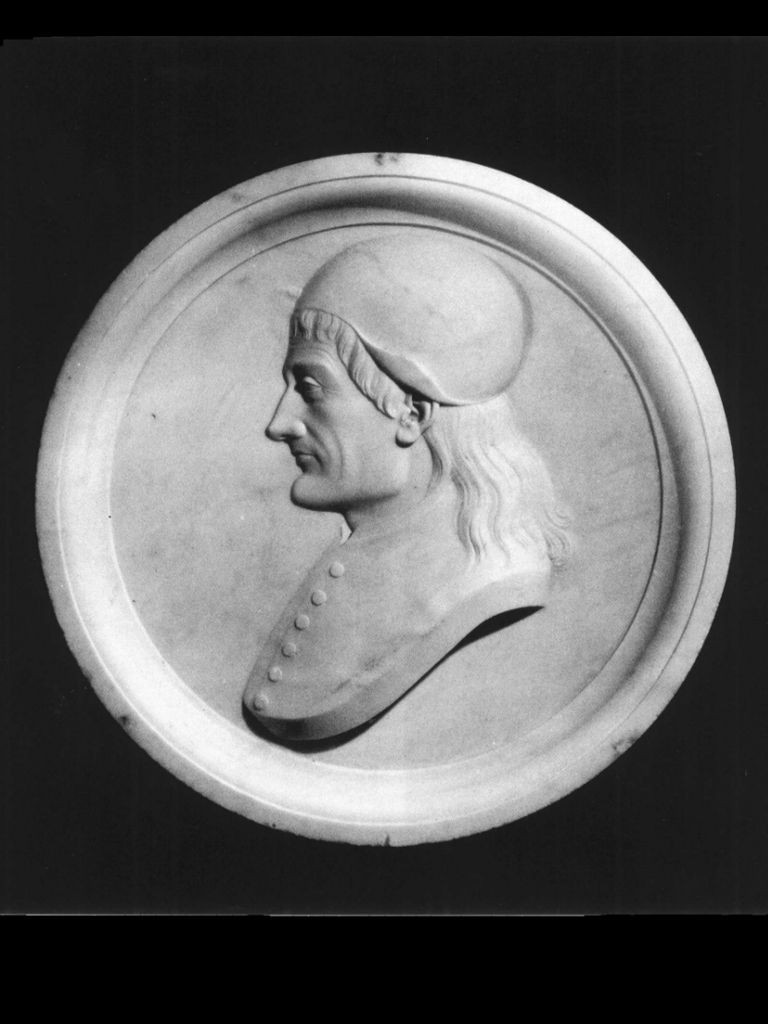
Anton Moro

- James Hutton: Proposed plutonism to the scientific community. At prior to being a scientist, he was a farmer in Scotland. He utilised his experiences of when he was farming to identify natural forces – notably gravity – contributing to the formation of rocks, as the Earth's landscape would slowly erode and deposit on lower planes. He first conducted his formal observations in Scotland, specifically at Glen Tilt of Perthshire, but made informal observations through his time as a farmer prior to becoming a geologist, noticing how the land he was farming was experiencing changes at a slow rate through aspects such as erosion and the deposition of sediments. He is regarded as “the Father of Geology”, as his work is present as core concepts within the uniformitarianism theory that became the widely accepted geological theory in the 1830s that ended the debate of whether plutonism or neptunism was the “correct” theory.

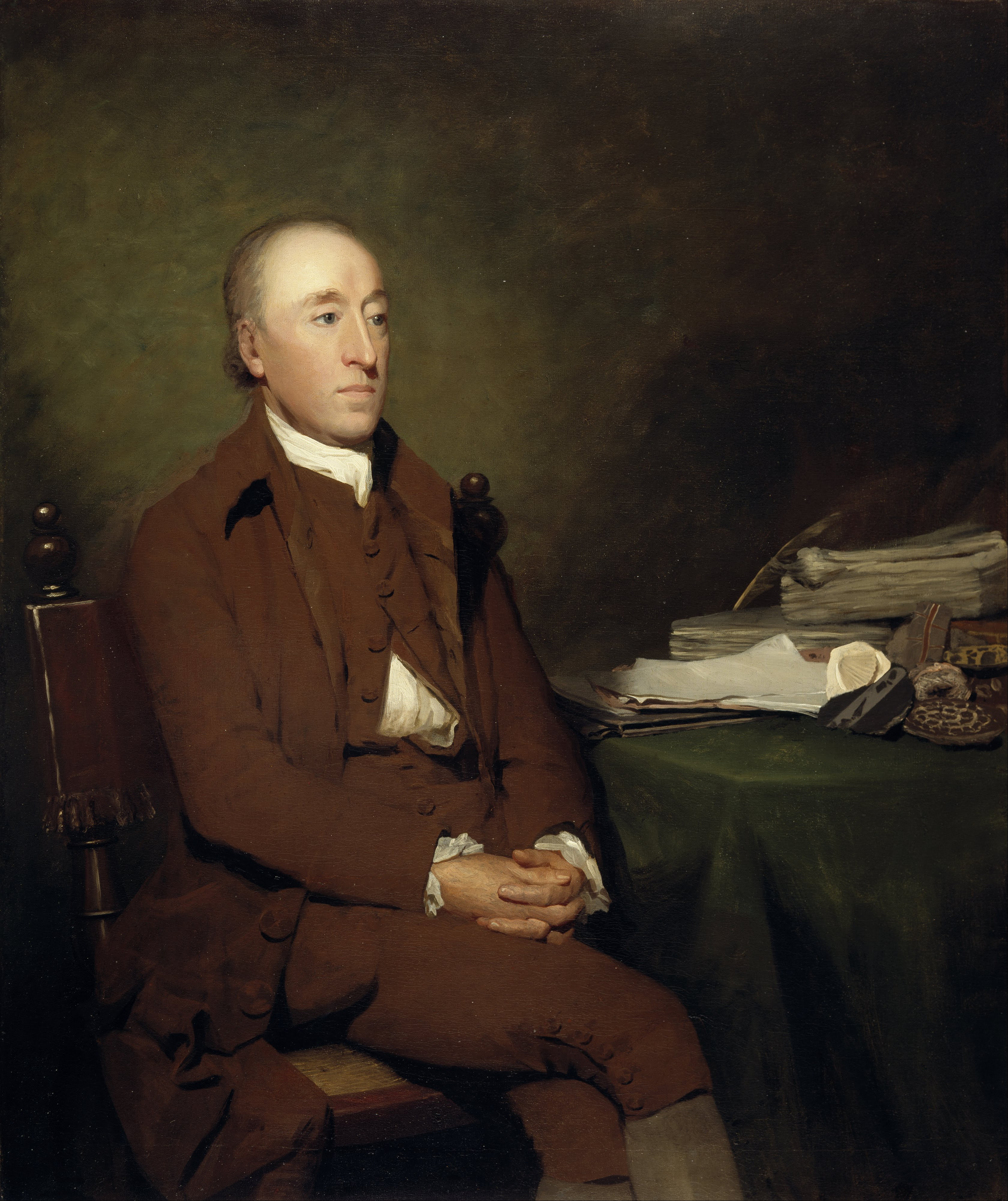
James Hutton, illustrated by Sir Henry Raeburn

- John Playfair: a natural philosophy professor who published Illustrations of the Huttonian Theory (1802) and shielded Hutton from opposition by neptunists. This allowed Hutton’s work to not simply disappear in the abyss of scientific hypotheses and proposed theories, ensuring that other scientists would be able to notice Hutton’s theories. Playfair’s work led to Lyell being more able to uncover the existence of such theories, which he then implemented within uniformitarianism to end the geological schism.

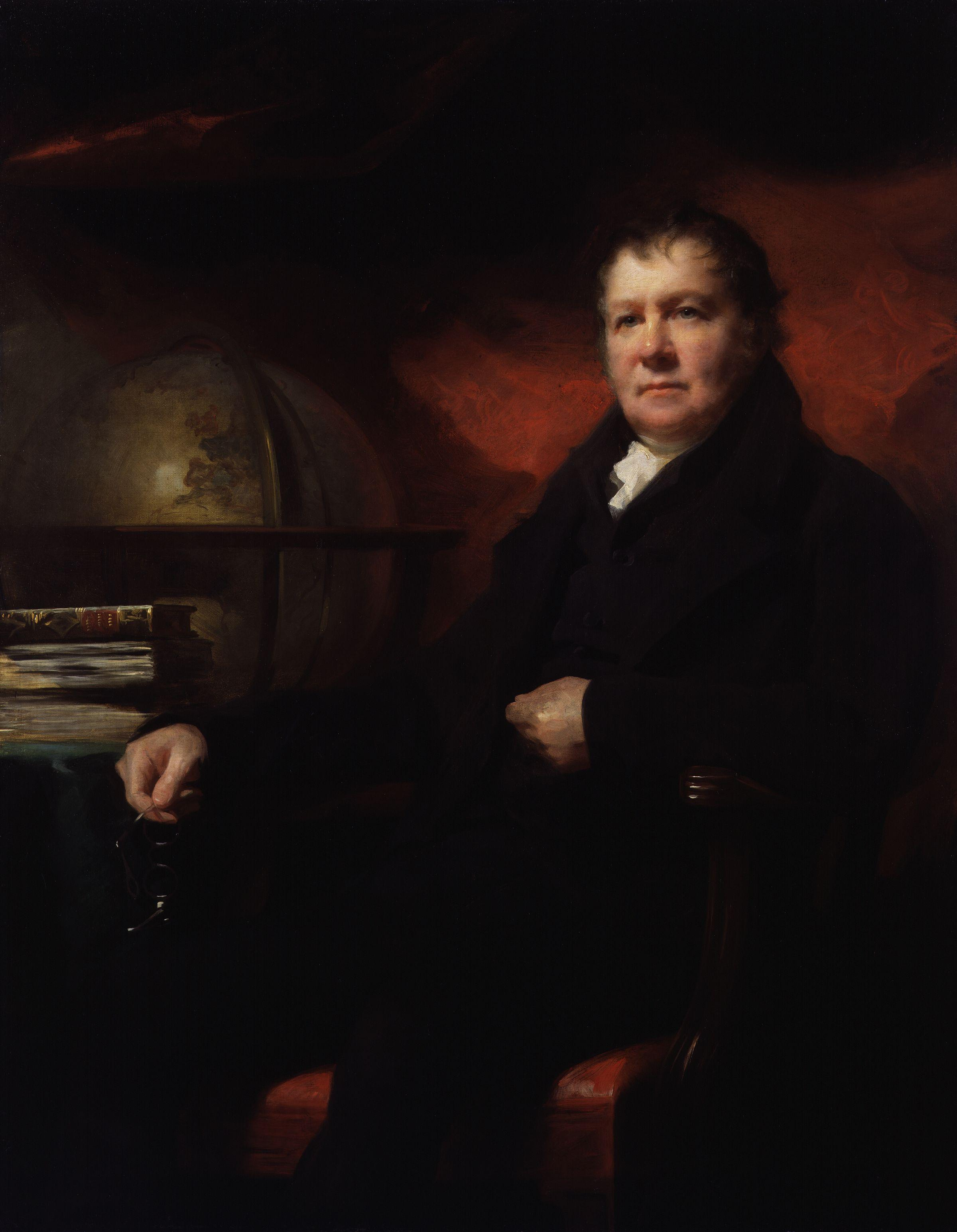
John Playfair

- Charles Lyell: a scientist who is credited as being “one of the most important scientists of geology in the 19th century”, due to founding uniformitarianism, which has been the widely accepted geological theory after the 1830s. His theory incorporated Hutton’s plutonism as core principles, which lead to a de facto acceptance of plutonism over neptunism. His theory, however, was competing with the theory of catastrophism, which accepted neptunism as part of its core concepts. Though at the time, uniformitarianism became more accepted, current scientific thinking now accepts that aspects of both theories are true for the general formation of the current landscape observed on the Earth.

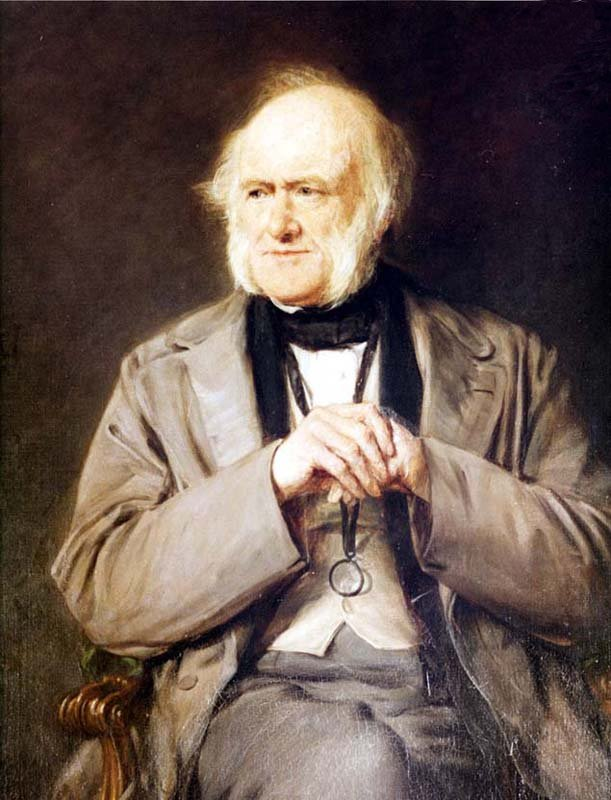
Charles Lyell
