= Abraham Gottlob Werner =

German geologist (1749–1817)

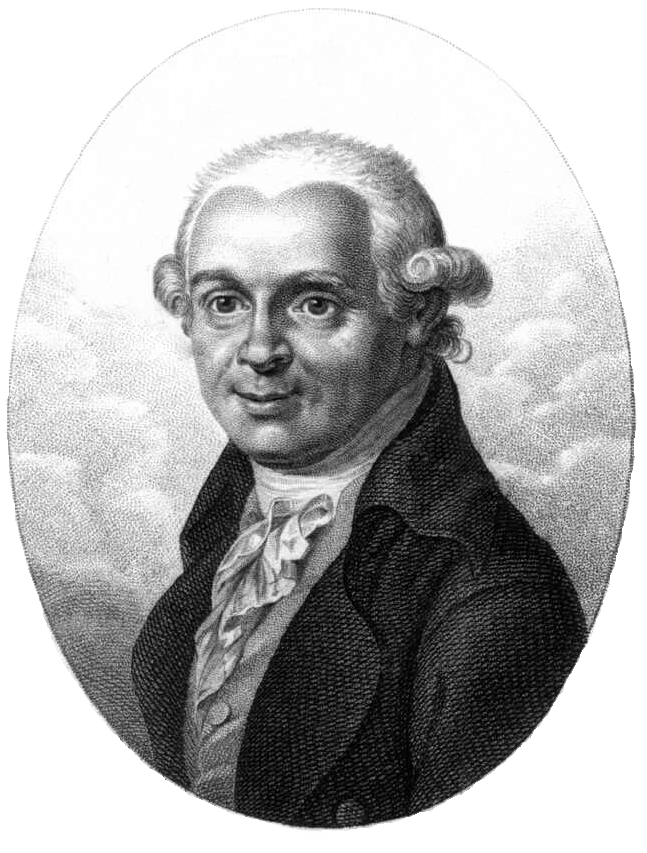
- Born: 25 September 1749; Wehrau, Prussian Silesia (now Osiecznica, Poland)
- Died: 30 June 1817 (aged 67); Dresden, Kingdom of Saxony
- Education: Freiberg Academy of Mining; University of Leipzig
- Known for: Stratification; Neptunism; Succession
- Scientific career
- Fields: Geology
- Workplaces: Freiberg Academy of Mining
- Doctoral advisor: Johann Carl Gehler
- Notable students: Christian Samuel Weiss; Christian Leopold von Buch; Friedrich Mohs; Henrik Steffens; Gotthilf Heinrich von Schubert; Franz von Baader; Alexander von Humboldt

Signature
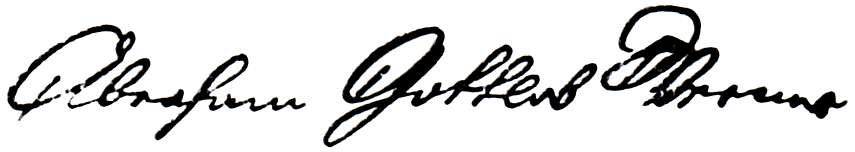

Abraham Gottlob Werner (German: [ˈaːbʁaham ˈɡɔtloːp ˈvɛʁnɐ]; 25 September 1749 – 30 June 1817) was a German geologist who set out an early theory about the stratification of the Earth's crust and propounded a history of the Earth that came to be known as Neptunism. While most tenets of Neptunism were eventually set aside, Werner is remembered for his demonstration of chronological succession in rocks; for the zeal with which he infused his pupils; and for the impulse he thereby gave to the study of geology. He has been called the "father of German geology".

== Life ==
Werner was born in Wehrau (now Osiecznica, Lower Silesian Voivodeship), a village in Prussian Silesia. His family had been involved in the mining industry for many years. His father, Abraham David Werner, was a foreman at a foundry in Wehrau.

Werner was educated at Freiberg and Leipzig, where he studied law and mining, and was then appointed as Inspector and Teacher of Mining and Mineralogy at the small, but influential, Freiberg Mining Academy in 1775.

While in Leipzig, Werner became interested in the systematic identification and classification of minerals. Within a year he published the first modern textbook on descriptive mineralogy, Von den äusserlichen Kennzeichen der Fossilien (On the External Characters of Fossils [or of Minerals]; 1774).

During his career, Werner published very little, but his fame as a teacher spread throughout Europe, attracting students, who became virtual disciples, and spread his interpretations throughout their homelands, e.g. Robert Jameson who became professor at Edinburgh and Andrés Manuel del Río who discovered vanadium. Socratic in his lecturing style, Werner developed an appreciation for the broader implications and interrelations of geology within his students, who provided an enthusiastic and attentive audience. Werner's students Friedrich Mohs (who was in 1818 also successor to Werner's chair at the Freiberg Mining Academy), Robert Jameson and G. Mitchell even had plans to establish an institute analogous to Freiberg Mining Academy in Dublin, which were due to the death of some people involved never carried out.

Werner was plagued by frail health his entire life, and passed a quiet existence in the immediate environs of Freiberg. An avid mineral collector in his youth, he abandoned field work altogether in his later life. There is no evidence that he had ever traveled beyond Saxony in his entire adult life. He died at Dresden from internal complications said to have been caused by his consternation over the misfortunes that had befallen Saxony during the Napoleonic Wars. He is buried in the Neuen Annenfriedhof in south-west Dresden. The grave is marked by a simple boulder inscribed with his name.

He was elected a foreign member of the Royal Swedish Academy of Sciences in 1810.

== Werner's theory ==
Starting from the pre-existing traditions of stratigraphy and cosmogony in Europe, Werner applied superposition in a classification similar to that of Johann Gottlob Lehmann. He believed that the Earth could be divided into five formations:

1. Primitive (Urgebirge) Series: intrusive igneous rocks and high rank metasediments considered to be the first precipitates from the ocean before the emergence of land.
2. Transition (Übergangsgebirge) Series: more indurated limestones, dikes, sills, and thick sequences of greywackes that were the first orderly deposits from the ocean. These were "universal" formations extending without interruption around the world.
3. Secondary or Stratified (Flötz) Series: the remaining, stratified fossiliferous rocks and certain associated "trap" rocks. These were thought to represent the emergence of mountains from beneath the ocean and were formed from the resulting products of erosion deposited on their flanks.
4. Alluvial or Tertiary (Aufgeschwemmte) Series: poorly consolidated sands, gravels, and clays formed by the withdrawal of the oceans from the continents.
5. Volcanic Series: younger lava flows demonstrably associated with volcanic vents. Werner believed that these rocks reflected the local effects of burning coal beds.

The basic concept of Wernerian geology was the belief in an all encompassing ocean that gradually receded to its present location while precipitating or depositing almost all the rocks and minerals in the Earth's crust. The emphasis on this initially universal ocean spawned the term "Neptunism" that became applied to the concept and it became virtually synonymous with Wernerian teaching, although Jean-Étienne Guettard in France actually originated the view. A universal ocean led directly to the idea of universal formations, which Werner believed could be recognized on the basis of lithology and superposition. He coined the term "geognosy" (meaning "knowledge of the Earth") to define a science based on the recognition of the order, position, and relation of the layers forming the Earth. Moreover, he did not consider the Earth’s timescale to be compatible with the Biblical sources. Werner believed that geognosy represented fact and not theory. His followers resisted speculation, and as a result Wernerian geognosy and Neptunism became dogma and ceased to contribute to further understanding of the history of the Earth.

His former student Robert Jameson, who later became Regius Professor at the University of Edinburgh, founded the Wernerian Natural History Society in 1808 in honour of Werner.

== Criticism ==
A principal focus of Neptunism that provoked almost immediate controversy involved the origin of basalt. Basalts, particularly formed as sills, were differentiated from surface lava flows, and the two were not recognized as the same rock type by Werner and his students during this period. Lavas and volcanoes of igneous origin were treated as very recent phenomena unrelated to the universal ocean that formed the layers of the Earth. Werner believed that volcanoes only occurred in proximity to coal beds. Burning melted overlying basalts and wackes, producing basalts and lavas typically at low elevations. Basalt at higher elevations proved to Werner that they were chemical precipitates of the ocean.

A second controversy surrounding Neptunism involved the volumetric problems associated with the universal ocean. How could he account for the covering of the entire Earth and then the shrinking of the ocean volume as the primitive and transitional mountains emerged and the secondary and tertiary deposits were formed? The movement of a significant volume of water into the Earth's interior had been proposed by the classical Greek geographer Strabo, but it was not embraced by Werner because it was associated with conjecture. Nevertheless, with his views on basalt, he did not believe that the interior of the Earth was molten. Werner appears to have dodged the question for the most part. He thought that some of the water could have been lost to space with the passing of some celestial body. That interpretation, however, raised the related question of explaining the return of the waters reflected in the secondary rocks.

== Legacy ==
Werner's ability as a lecturer attracted students from all over Europe. Applications of his ideas fomented debate, particularly over the origin of basalt, in the so-called Neptunist-Plutonist controversy. Among his most famous students was Alexander von Humboldt, who stayed in Freiberg in 1791-92, and initially subscribed to Werner's Neptunist ideas before departing from them in his later years.

The variety of scapolite known as wernerite is named in his honour. Werner is credited with coining the term geognosy, for the geological study of the Earth's structure, specifically its exterior and interior construction.

In 1805, he described the mineral zoisite and named it after Sigmund Zois, who sent him its specimens from Saualpe in Carinthia.

Werner's major work, Von den äußerlichen Kennzeichen der Foßilien (1774), contained a comprehensive colour scheme he had devised for the description and classification of minerals. The work, incorporating this colour nomenclature with some modifications, was translated into French by Claudine Guyton de Morveau (née Picardet) in 1790 and into English by Thomas Weaver in 1805. Patrick Syme (1774–1845), painter to the Wernerian and Horticultural Societies of Edinburgh, published in 1814 a revised version, entitled Werner's Nomenclature of Colours, with Additions, arranged so as to render it useful to the Arts and Sciences. In Germany, the scheme was favoured, for example, by the young polymath Novalis (Friedrich von Hardenberg) (1772–1801), who was impressed by its analytical character.

The Werner Mountains in Antarctica and the Werner Range in Greenland were named after him.

== Works ==
- Von den äusserlichen Kennzeichen der Fossilien (Leipzig, 1774; French translation by Mme. Guyton de Morveau, Paris, 1790; English translation, Treatise on the External Characters of Fossils, by Weaver, Dublin, 1805; later reprinted with notes by the Wernerian Society, Edinburgh, 1849–50).
- Kurze Klassifikation und Beschreibung der verschiedenen Gebirgsarten (Dresden, 1787).
- Neue Theorie über Entstehung der Gänge (Freiberg, 1791; French translation by Daubuisson, Paris, 1803; English translation by Charles Anderson as "New Theory of the Formation of Veins, with its Application to the Art of Working Mines", Edinburgh, 1809).
