= Deep time =

Time scales on the billions of years

Deep time is the concept of geological time that spans billions of years, far beyond the scale of human experience. It provides the temporal framework for understanding the formation and evolution of Earth, the development of life, and the slow-moving processes that shape planetary change. First developed as a scientific idea in the 18th century and popularized in the 20th century by writers such as John McPhee, the concept of deep time has influenced fields ranging from geology and evolutionary biology to climate science, philosophy, education, and environmental ethics. Today, deep time is increasingly used in science communication and public engagement, offering a lens for understanding human impact during the Anthropocene.

== Origins and definition ==
The philosophical concept of geological time was developed in the 18th century by Scottish geologist James Hutton; his "system of the habitable Earth" was a deistic mechanism keeping the world eternally suitable for humans. The modern concept entails huge changes over the age of the Earth which has been determined to be, after a long and complex history of developments, around 4.55 billion years.

Life timeline
← / Earth formed; ← / Earliest water; ← / LUCA; ← / Earliest fossils; ← / Great Oxygenation Event; ← / Sexual reproduction; ← / Earliest fungi; ← / Neoproterozoic oxygenation event; ← / Ediacaran biota; ← / Cambrian explosion; ← / Earliest tetrapods; ← / Earliest hominoid
(million years ago)

James Hutton based his view of deep time on a form of geochemistry that had developed in Scotland and Scandinavia from the 1750s onward. As mathematician John Playfair, one of Hutton's friends and colleagues in the Scottish Enlightenment, remarked upon seeing the strata of the angular unconformity at Siccar Point with Hutton and James Hall in June 1788, "the mind seemed to grow giddy by looking so far into the abyss of time".

== Early theories ==
Early geologists such as Nicolas Steno and Horace Bénédict de Saussure had developed ideas of geological strata forming from water through chemical processes, which Abraham Gottlob Werner developed into a theory known as Neptunism, envisaging the slow crystallisation of minerals in the ancient oceans of the Earth to form rock. Hutton's innovative 1785 theory, based on Plutonism, visualised an endless cyclical process of rocks forming under the sea, being uplifted and tilted, then eroded to form new strata under the sea. In 1788 the sight of Hutton's Unconformity at Siccar Point convinced Playfair and Hall of this extremely slow cycle, and in that same year Hutton memorably wrote "we find no vestige of a beginning, no prospect of an end".

== Developments in the 19th century ==
The 19th century saw major expansion in how scientists conceptualized Earth's history, transforming deep time from a radical idea into a foundational principle of geology and evolutionary theory. Building on the foundations laid by James Hutton, several competing theories emerged that attempted to explain the formation of Earth's features over immense timescales.

Georges Cuvier, a pioneer of paleontology, proposed that Earth's history was marked by a series of catastrophic events, each followed by the sudden appearance of new life forms. This theory of catastrophism suggested a segmented past, rather than a continuous one. Adam Sedgwick, who helped popularize catastrophism in Britain, introduced his student Charles Darwin to his way of thinking—prompting Darwin to later joke that Sedgwick was adept at "drawing large cheques upon the Bank of Time."

In a competing theory, Charles Lyell advanced a theory known as uniformitarianism, articulated in his Principles of Geology (1830–1833). Lyell proposed that slow, gradual processes such as erosion, sedimentation, and volcanic activity had shaped the Earth's surface over vast periods—implying an Earth far older than previously imagined. His view echoed and extended Hutton's original ideas, and positioned deep time as essential to understanding Earth's dynamic systems.

Darwin, deeply influenced by Lyell's thinking, read Principles of Geology during his voyage on HMS Beagle in the 1830s. Lyell's framing of deep time provided Darwin with the necessary timescale to support his own emerging theory of evolution by natural selection. Without a vast temporal backdrop, evolutionary change would have seemed implausible. Thus, the acceptance of deep time in geology directly enabled new theories of life's development and diversification.

== Intellectual responses ==
Throughout history, scholars and thinkers have attempted to make the vastness of deep time more intelligible. In The Science of Life (1929), H. G. Wells and Julian Huxley dismissed the difficulty of grasping geological time, arguing that "The use of different scales is simply a matter of practice." Like maps or microscopes, deep time requires training the imagination.

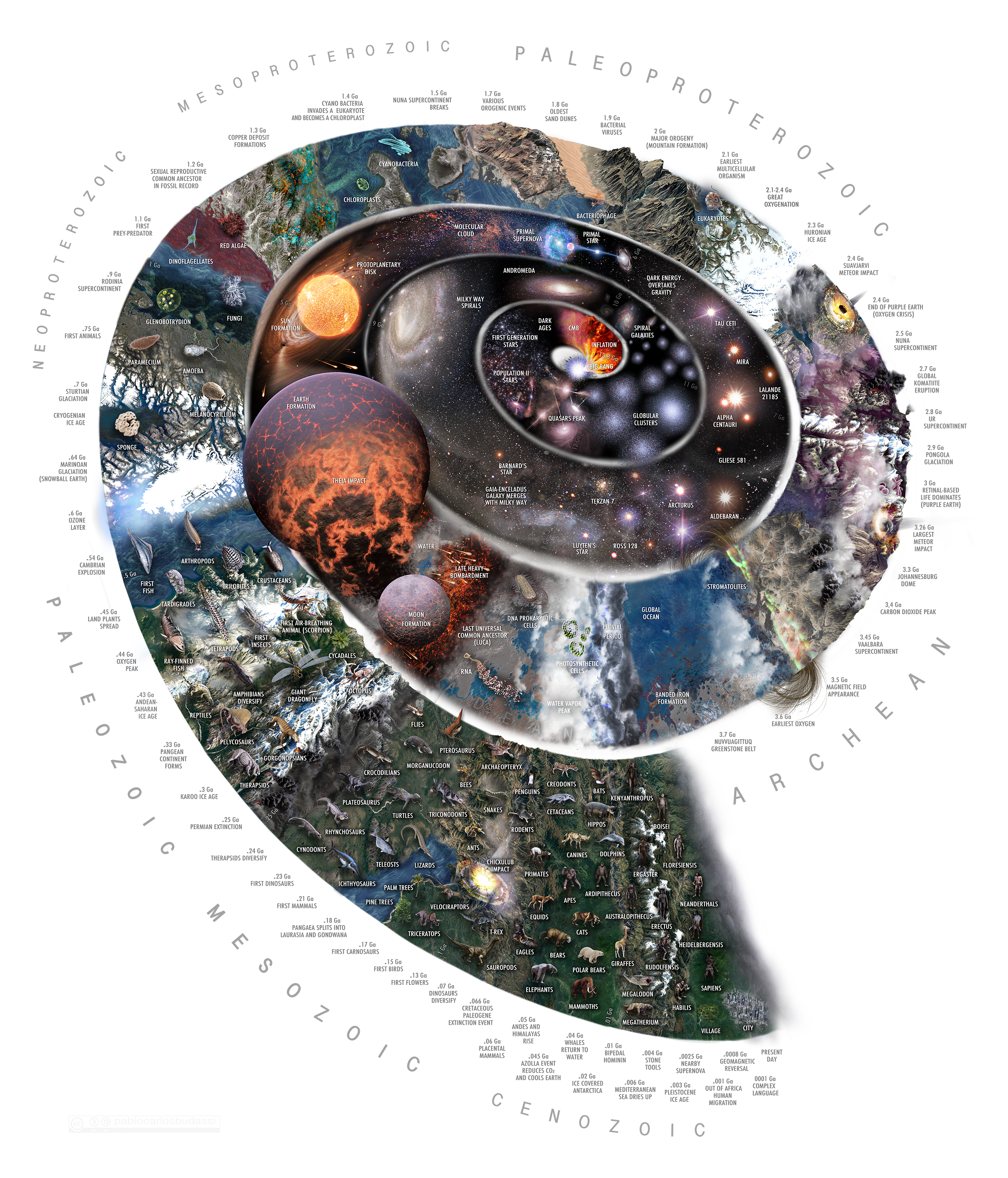
In this illustration of the Big History the unit Ga ("giga-annum") has been chosen to bring the different periods and events into graspable numbers.

Modern authors have echoed this need for reframing. Physicist Gregory Benford's Deep Time: How Humanity Communicates Across Millennia (1999) and paleontologist Henry Gee's In Search of Deep Time: Beyond the Fossil Record to a New History of Life (2001) both explore how science and storytelling intersect to help people comprehend timescales far beyond human experience. Stephen Jay Gould's Time's Arrow, Time's Cycle (1987) traces how scientific metaphors shape our temporal assumptions.

11th century thinkers, like Avicenna in Persia and Shen Kuo in China, proposed timelines that stretched far beyond biblical frameworks. Meanwhile, Thomas Berry and Joanna Macy argue that experiencing deep time is essential to planetary stewardship, influencing movements like deep ecology and ecosophy.

== Today's applications ==
=== The Anthropocene ===
The concept of deep time has taken on renewed urgency in discussions surrounding the Anthropocene—the proposed geological epoch defined by human impact on Earth's systems. In a landmark Science article, a multidisciplinary group of researchers argued that the Anthropocene is stratigraphically and functionally distinct from the Holocene marking a break in Earth's natural history that is visible in the geologic record.

=== Rethinking human time ===
Anthropologists and philosophers have further explored the cultural and conceptual ramifications of this shift. The University of Vienna's Anthropocene Project promotes "deep time literacy" as a tool for understanding our species' geological footprint, while scholars such as Matt Edgeworth argue that archaeological traces from the modern world blur traditional boundaries between human time and geological time.

Scholar Jakko Kemper argues that deep time offers a necessary counterbalance to the "microtime" of tech-driven economies, which prioritize short-term profits and optimization over long-term planetary care. By grounding human activity within geological time, he suggests, deep time thinking challenges anthropocentric timelines and encourages more reflective approaches to environmental and technological governance.

=== Science communication ===
The concept of deep time has become a tool for science communication, especially in the context of climate change and environmental responsibility. The Smithsonian National Museum of Natural History opened the David H. Koch Hall of Fossils, a deep time exhibit contextualizing Earth's evolutionary past alongside present ecological challenges. This presentation encourages visitors to think beyond human lifespans and understand the long arc of planetary transformation.

Media outlets have similarly leveraged the idea of deep time to encourage a shift in public perception. The BBC describes how contemplating deep time can foster patience, humility, and long-term thinking—qualities increasingly recognized as essential in the Anthropocene era. Podcasts are chiming in, as an episode of the Land and Climate Review podcast explored how nuclear waste repositories—designed to remain secure for tens of thousands of years—offer a real-world case study in communicating and planning across deep time scales.

=== Legacy and the future ===
Public-facing scholarship and exhibitions echo this view. The Smithsonian Human Origins Program describes deep time as a framework that helps us "understand how we arrived at our present moment and how our choices will shape the future"—placing current human behaviors in the context of long evolutionary arcs and environmental change. Popular science outlets like Discover Magazine also continue to amplify this discourse, helping readers grapple with the scale and implications of deep time in an age of accelerating change.

== See also ==
- Timeline of human evolution
- History of life
- History of Earth – Records of Earth's development
- Big History – Education strategy or academic discipline
- Chronology of the Universe – History and future of the universe
- Clock of the Long Now – Clock designed to keep time for 10,000 years
- Deep history – Academic discipline that studies humanity's origins
- Formation of the Solar System
- Long-term nuclear waste warning messages
- The World Without Us – 2007 non-fiction book by Alan Weisman

== Sources ==
=== Web ===
- Campbell, Anthony (2001). "Book review: In Search of Deep Time". Archived from the original on 2007-01-02.
- Colebrook, Michael (2014). "Thomas Berry". Archived from the original on 2014-12-08. Retrieved 2025-02-17.
- Darwin, C. R. (1831-07-09). "Darwin Correspondence Project – Letter 101 — Darwin, C. R. to Fox, W. D., (9 July 1831)". Archived from the original on 16 January 2009.
- Korthof, Gert (2000). "A Revolution in Palaeontology: Review of Henry Gee's In Search of Deep Time". Archived from the original on 2014-05-29.
- Montgomery, Keith (2003). "Siccar Point and Teaching the History of Geology" (PDF). University of Wisconsin. Archived (PDF) from the original on 2016-04-15.
- Palmer, A. R.; Zen, E-an. Critical Issues Committee (ed.). "The Context of Humanity: Understanding Deep Time". Geological Society of America. Archived from the original on 2006-03-26.
- Rance, Hugh (1999). "Hutton's unconformities" (PDF). Historical Geology: The Present is the Key to the Past. QCC Press. Archived from the original (PDF) on 2008-12-03.

=== Books ===
- Ialenti, Vincent (2020). Deep Time Reckoning: How Future Thinking Can Help Earth Now. Cambridge, Massachusetts: The MIT Press. Archived from the original on 2021-06-16.
- McPhee, John (1998). Annals of the Former World. New York: Farrar, Straus and Giroux.
- Repcheck, Jack (2003). "Chapters 2 and 5". The Man Who Found Time: James Hutton and the Discovery of the Earth's Antiquity. Cambridge: Perseus Books. ISBN 0-7382-0692-X.
- Rossi, Paolo (1984). The Dark Abyss of Time: The History of the Earth and the History of Nations from Hooke to Vico, tr. by Lydia Cochrane, Chicago: University of Chicago Press, pp. 338, ISBN 0226728358.
- Sivin, Nathan (1995). Science in Ancient China: Researches and Reflections. Brookfield, Vermont: Ashgate Publishing Variorum series. pp. III, 23–24.
- Toulmin, Stephen; Goodfield, June (1965). The Ancestry of Science: The Discovery of Time. University of Chicago Press. p. 64.
- White, Andrew Dickson (1896). A History of the Warfare of Science with Theology in Christendom. New York: D. Appleton & Company. Archived from the original on 2007-10-05.
- Winchester, Simon (2001). "Chapter 2". The Map That Changed the World: William Smith and the Birth of Modern Geology. New York: HarperCollins. ISBN 0-06-019361-1.

=== Journal articles ===
- Ialenti, Vincent (2014). "Adjudicating Deep Time: Revisiting The United States' High-Level Nuclear Waste Repository Project At Yucca Mountain". Science & Technology Studies. 27 (2). doi:10.23987/sts.55323. SSRN 2457896.
- Kubicek, Robert (2008-03-01). "Ages in Chaos: James Hutton and the Discovery of Deep Time". The Historian. 70 (1): 142–143. ISBN 978-0-7653-1238-9.
- Playfair, John (1805). "Hutton's Unconformity". Transactions of the Royal Society of Edinburgh. V (III).
