= Time's Arrow, Time's Cycle =

1987 book by Stephen Jay Gould

- Cover of the hardcover edition
- Author: Stephen Jay Gould
- Language: English
- Subject: History of geology
- Publisher: Harvard University Press
- Publication date: 1987
- Publication place: United States
- Media type: Print (Hardcover and Paperback)
- Pages: 222 pp.
- ISBN: 0-674-89198-8
- LC Class: QE508 .G68 1987

Time's Arrow, Time's Cycle: Myth and Metaphor in the Discovery of Geological Time is a 1987 history of geology by the paleontologist Stephen Jay Gould, in which the author offers a historical account of the conceptualization of Deep Time and uniformitarianism using the works of the English theologian Thomas Burnet, and the Scottish geologists James Hutton and Charles Lyell.

== Deep Time ==
Gould ranks the development of the concept "deep time," which involved deliberately rejecting the biblical description of earth's past for nearly incomprehensible eons, with the revolutions associated with Copernicus and Charles Darwin. To illustrate this, Gould picked three major figures in the history of geology, one traditional villain (Thomas Burnet) and two traditional heroes (James Hutton and Charles Lyell).

== Flimsy 'cardboard' ==
Standard textbook accounts of the achievements of these three figures have long provided what Gould describes as a "self-serving mythology." These flimsy "cardboard" accounts vaunt the superiority of empiricism and inductivism over the scientific nemesis of religious bigotry.

This legend, as perpetuated by geology textbooks over the last century, claims that geology remained in the service of the Mosaic story of creation so long as armchair geological theorists refused to place fieldwork ahead of scriptural authority. Thomas Burnet was just such an archetypical religious spokesman. A century later, Hutton heroically broke with this biblical zealotry by arguing that geological evidence must rest upon a solid empirical foundation. The Earth's strata, when carefully examined, betray "no vestige of a beginning—no prospect of an end." But Hutton was far ahead of his time. So it was not until Charles Lyell published the Principles of Geology that geologists finally came to accept Hutton's basic message and banished miraculous intervention, catastrophes, and biblical deluges from their science.

Having elaborated this bit of scientific melodrama, Gould proceeds to demolish it by showing that the actualities of Hutton's and Lyell's work were the opposite of the textbook legend. His intention is not simply to debunk the textbook legend, which has already been debunked by historians such as Martin J. S. Rudwick. He sets out to rectify the error and show the real sources of inspiration in the development of deep time which have not been properly understood.

== Kuhnian revolutions ==
Gould is deeply influenced by Thomas Kuhn's The Structure of Scientific Revolutions (1962). Kuhn argued, in part, that science is a social activity and that theories are intellectual constructions imposed on data, not demanded by them. Along with Kuhn and other philosophers and sociologists of science, Gould has recognized that mental constructs (metaphors, analogies, personal philosophies, imaginative leaps)—not empirical discoveries—are what bring about scientific advance. "Facts" are so embedded in a paradigm that they simply do not have the kind of independent probative power they were once thought to possess.

The development of the idea of deep time is by no means fieldwork, as the textbook myths would have us believe. Rather, Gould pinpoints a powerful pair of metaphors—time's arrow and time's cycle—by which humankind has always tried to grasp the concept of time. Time's arrow captures the uniqueness and distinctive character of sequential events, whereas time's cycle provides these events with another kind of meaning by evoking lawfulness and predictability.

More importantly, this metaphorical pair of ideas was essential to the thinking of the three geological protagonists; and the paired concepts therefore offer the key, now obscured by textbook mythology, to unlocking their thinking about time.

== Burnet ==
Burnet's theory is a one-cycle theory in which biblical narrative (time's arrow) runs its course within a wider conception of "the great year" and "great circle of time and fate" that bring about the return of Paradise.

It is his belief in Scripture that made Burnet a pariah in the history of geology. Yet Burnet was hardly the religious fanatic he is painted to have been within the context of his contemporary scientific thought.

In contrast to textbook legend, Burnet was adamant about explaining the Biblical history of the earth entirely within the frame of natural science, devoid of all appeals to miracles or divine intervention. Thus this "bad guy" of geological textbook history was actually more devoted to rational, miracle-free science than the greatest scientists of his age.

== Hutton’s endless cycles of deep time ==
Before James Hutton, most geological theorists had dealt only with processes of decay. The earth was created and its geologic structures just wore down through catastrophic events like weathering and especially the biblical Flood.

Hutton introduced the concept of repair into geology and, with it, the notion of deep time, however Hutton's hypothesis of the earth as a geological clockwork of eroding continents balanced against uplifting ocean basins was not based on his field observations but on a priori conceptions inspired jointly by religious considerations and "the most rigid and uncompromising version of time's cycle ever developed by a geologist."

His ideas grew out of what has been called "the paradox of the soil." Good soil - the product of the "denudation," or erosion of rock strata, eventually loses its richness to the plant life it sustains. To Hutton, the thought that there were no geological sources for continual new soil meant that the world bore the intolerable stamp of an imperfectly designed abode for man's existence. His anthropocentric and teleological concept of the world - driven by his religious faith - therefore required that fertile soil, should never run out. This in turn, needed the uplift of new strata to become the sources for soil replenishment.

Hutton therefore, set out to find evidence for uplift and found much evidence he interpreted to be repeated uplifts of the Earth's crust. This led him inexorably to the idea of deep time.

His view of deep time was of an endlessly cycling earth having "no vestige of a beginning" and "no prospect of an end". As a consequence it appears that he lost all interest in the historical nature of geological change. The divine benevolence that he saw in these cycles of uplift, erosion and sedimentation was everything to Hutton. Gould viewed Hutton as an unlikely hero for empiricist geology, who nevertheless became one.

Gould reconstructs the process of mythification of Hutton and sees it as involving several stages.

First, Hutton's long and turgid Theory of the Earth (1795) was popularized by his friend John Playfair (1802). Not only did Playfair make up for Hutton's difficult prose, but he also modernized Hutton's theory by downplaying both his "denial of biblical history" and his repeated appeals to final causes. Subsequently, Charles Lyell, who needed an empiricist hero for his own account of the warfare between science and religious bigotry, bolstered Hutton's image as a fieldworker who had no conceptual bias. Finally the legend was consolidated in the writings of later geologists, who rarely bothered to read Hutton in the original.

== Lyell’s uniformitarianism ==
It is important to bear in mind that Charles Lyell was trained as a lawyer. His rhetorical skills were considerable and they are crucial to understanding his impact upon the history of geology.

When pleading for his favorite client, which became known as the "uniformitarian" theory of geology, he portrayed the previous history of his discipline as a gradual overcoming of primitive superstitions, wild speculations, and biblical allegiances. In doing so he created his own legend as an arch-empiricist free of all bias and preconception.

But Lyell was not selling just evidence and fieldwork over previous dogma and speculative theory. Rather he foisted upon his contemporaries a "fascinating and particular theory rooted in…time's cycle" by conflating a number of distinct elements under the single banner of "uniformitarianism," the regularity of physical laws with the irregularity of history.

=== The philosophical assumptions ===
First, Lyell argued for the uniformity of nature's laws (that is, the notion that laws do not change with time or place). Second, he argued for the uniformity of process, which simply means always explaining past changes by currently known causes even if catastrophic interpretations may be just as explanatory. Contrary to legend, Lyell's catastrophic opponents accepted both of these philosophical aspects of "uniformity."

What Lyell's critics did not accept were two further substantive hypotheses about the world that he included under the heading of good (uniformitarian) science.

=== The substantive hypotheses ===
These claims were that rates of geological change are always uniform and gradual and that the general state of the world also remains uniform (that is, there is no progression or directionality in the long run). Far from using Hutton's field data to show that the earth has passed through vast epochs of change, Lyell drew on the peculiarly static spirit of Hutton's vision to conceive an earth that, although unimaginably old, had changed hardly at all.

The last of these claims was the most peculiar of all within Lyell's vision of earth history. It led him to deny all evidence of progression in the fossil record and hence to reject not only Lamarck's theory of evolution but also contemporary catastrophist notions, in which "higher" organisms were thought to replace "lower" ones after mass extinctions. If fossils seemed to belie this, if mammals were absent from older rocks, it was simply because fossils were rare and scattered.

In showing how Hutton and Lyell were dedicated not to modern notions of geological dynamism but to antique ones of geological steady-state, Gould points out that Lyell was even less of an empiricist than most of his catastrophist and creationist opponents.

For Lyell was constantly forced to deny the literal evidence of the geological record, which shows whole groups of organisms being abruptly replaced by different sets of organisms in adjacent strata. His gradualist reading of the geological record therefore required his constant "interpretation" of the recalcitrant evidence in order to reconcile it with his notions of time's stately cycle and a world without abrupt changes.

=== From steady state to progressionism ===
Nor was Lyell's eventual conversion to evolution a strictly empirical affair. When he finally took this step publicly, in 1868, it was not because he had been persuaded by Darwin's theory of natural selection. In fact, Lyell rejected that theory, accepting only a general evolutionary process without its celebrated Darwinian mechanism.

Admitting nonmiraculous progression (that is, evolution) in turn allowed him to preserve three of his four uniformities (uniformity of law, process, and rate) while giving up only uniformity of state. This was as Gould notes, "the most conservative intellectual option available to him."

Charles Lyell may have lost the battle over progressionism to Darwinism, but through rhetoric he won a battle against catastrophism, which enabled his hypothesis of the uniformity of rate to become a textbook shibboleth.

The catastrophists of Lyell's day, Gould nevertheless maintains, were right all along. The literal fossil evidence of major rapid changes in previous faunas does not need to be interpreted away, as Lyell tried to do by appealing to the imperfection of the geological record.

Gould sees supreme irony in the recent hypothesis of the Berkeley scientists Luis and Walter Alvarez that mass extinctions were caused by asteroidal or cometary impacts (a hypothesis now made plausible by the discovery of a worldwide iridium layer deposited at the Cretaceous-Tertiary boundary); for this is precisely the sort of wild "cosmological" speculation that Lyell derided in seventeenth-century writers like William Whiston.

Gould concludes Time's Arrow, Time's Cycle by insisting that arrows and cycles are "eternal metaphors" in the understanding of time. In a thoughtful complement to his discussion of the history of geology, he shows how these two metaphors have figured in the art and sculpture associated with major biblical themes. Both metaphors, he concludes, are needed "for any comprehensive view of history."

== Details ==
- Publisher: Harvard University Press
- ISBN 0-674-89198-8 (Hardback 1987)
- ISBN 0-674-89199-6 (Paperback 1988)
- Language: English
