= Uniformitarianism =

Assumption that natural laws are constant through time and space

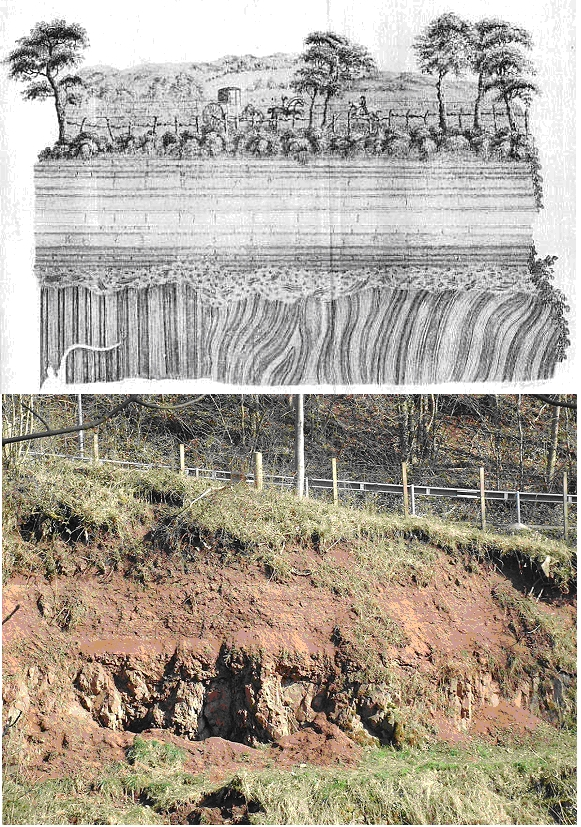
Hutton's Unconformity at Jedburgh. Above: John Clerk of Eldin's 1787 illustration. Below: 2003 photograph.

Uniformitarianism, also known as the Doctrine of Uniformity or the Uniformitarian Principle, is the assumption that the same natural laws and processes that operate in our present-day scientific observations have always operated in the universe in the past and apply everywhere in the universe. It refers to invariance in the metaphysical principles underpinning science, such as the constancy of cause and effect throughout space-time, but has also been used to describe spatiotemporal invariance of physical laws. Though an unprovable postulate that cannot be verified using the scientific method, some consider that uniformitarianism should be a required first principle in scientific research.

In geology, uniformitarianism has included the gradualistic concept that "the present is the key to the past" and that geological events occur at the same rate now as they have always done, though many modern geologists no longer hold to a strict gradualism. Coined by William Whewell, uniformitarianism was originally proposed in contrast to catastrophism by British naturalists in the late 18th century, starting with the work of the geologist James Hutton in his many books including Theory of the Earth. Hutton's work was later refined by scientist John Playfair and popularised by geologist Charles Lyell's Principles of Geology in 1830. Today, Earth's history is considered to have been a slow, gradual process, punctuated by occasional natural catastrophic events.

== History ==
=== 18th century ===
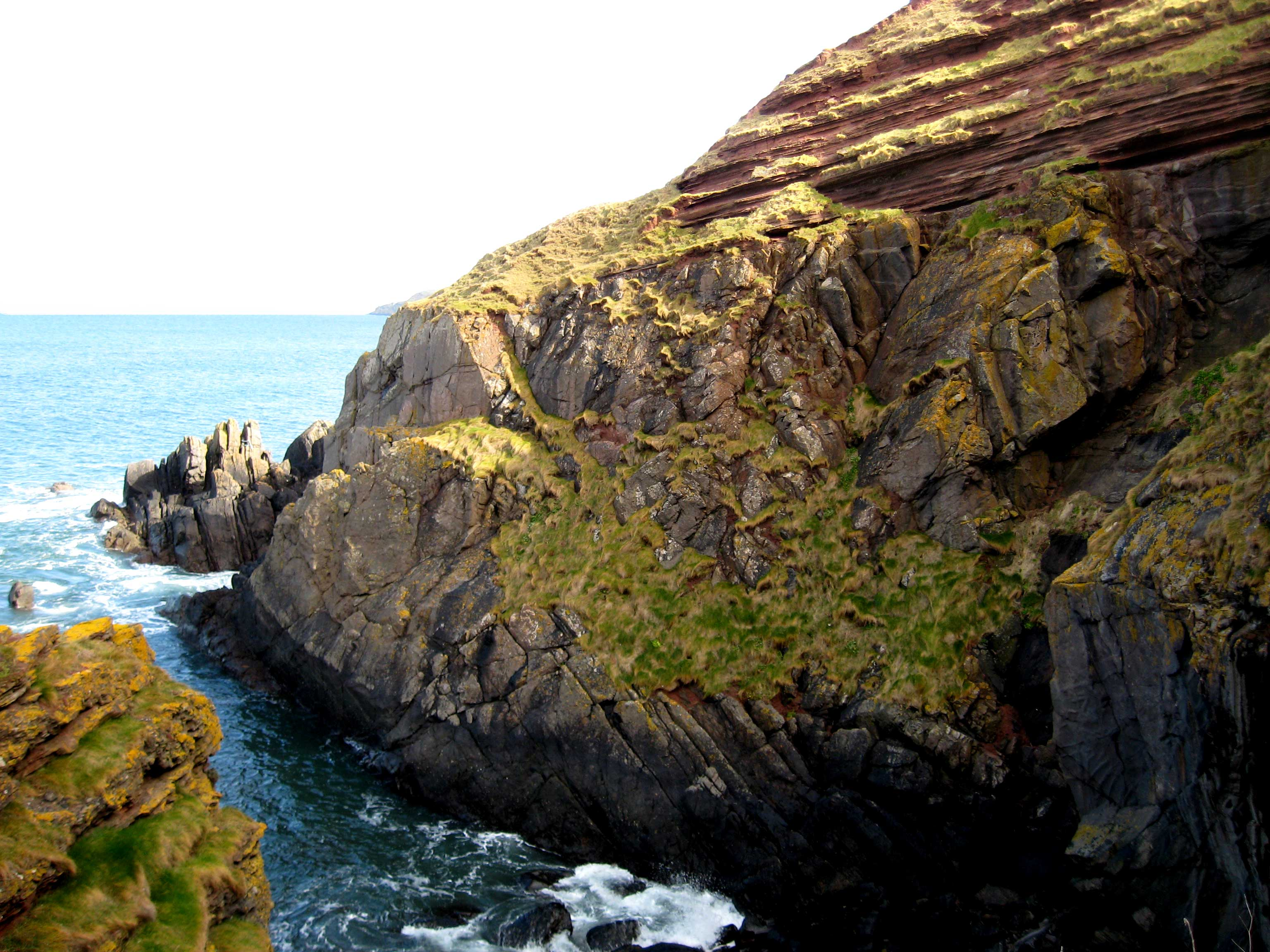
Cliff at the east of Siccar Point in Berwickshire, showing the gently tilting red sandstone layers above vertically tilted greywacke rocks

Abraham Gottlob Werner (1749–1817) proposed Neptunism, where strata represented deposits from shrinking seas precipitated onto primordial rocks such as granite. In 1785 James Hutton proposed an opposing, self-maintaining infinite cycle based on natural history and not on the Biblical account.

The solid parts of the present land appear in general, to have been composed of the productions of the sea, and of other materials similar to those now found upon the shores. Hence we find a reason to conclude:

1st, That the land on which we rest is not simple and original, but that it is a composition, and had been formed by the operation of second causes.
2nd, That before the present land was made, there had subsisted a world composed of sea and land, in which were tides and currents, with such operations at the bottom of the sea as now take place. And,
Lastly, That while the present land was forming at the bottom of the ocean, the former land maintained plants and animals; at least the sea was then inhabited by animals, in a similar manner as it is at present.

Hence we are led to conclude, that the greater part of our land, if not the whole had been produced by operations natural to this globe; but that in order to make this land a permanent body, resisting the operations of the waters, two things had been required;

1st, The consolidation of masses formed by collections of loose or incoherent materials;
2ndly, The elevation of those consolidated masses from the bottom of the sea, the place where they were collected, to the stations in which they now remain above the level of the ocean.

Hutton then sought evidence to support his idea that there must have been repeated cycles, each involving deposition on the seabed, uplift with tilting and erosion, and then moving undersea again for further layers to be deposited. At Glen Tilt in the Cairngorm mountains he found granite penetrating metamorphic schists, in a way which indicated to him that the presumed primordial rock had been molten after the strata had formed. He had read about angular unconformities as interpreted by Neptunists, and found an unconformity at Jedburgh where layers of greywacke in the lower layers of the cliff face have been tilted almost vertically before being eroded to form a level plane, under horizontal layers of Old Red Sandstone. In the spring of 1788 he took a boat trip along the Berwickshire coast with John Playfair and the geologist Sir James Hall, and found a dramatic unconformity showing the same sequence at Siccar Point. Playfair later recalled that "the mind seemed to grow giddy by looking so far into the abyss of time", and Hutton concluded a 1788 paper he presented at the Royal Society of Edinburgh, later rewritten as a book, with the phrase "we find no vestige of a beginning, no prospect of an end".

Both Playfair and Hall wrote their own books on the theory, and for decades robust debate continued between Hutton's supporters and the Neptunists. Georges Cuvier's paleontological work in the 1790s, which established the reality of extinction, explained this by local catastrophes, after which other fixed species repopulated the affected areas. In Britain, geologists adapted this idea into "diluvial theory" which proposed repeated worldwide annihilation and creation of new fixed species adapted to a changed environment, initially identifying the most recent catastrophe as the biblical flood.

=== 19th century ===
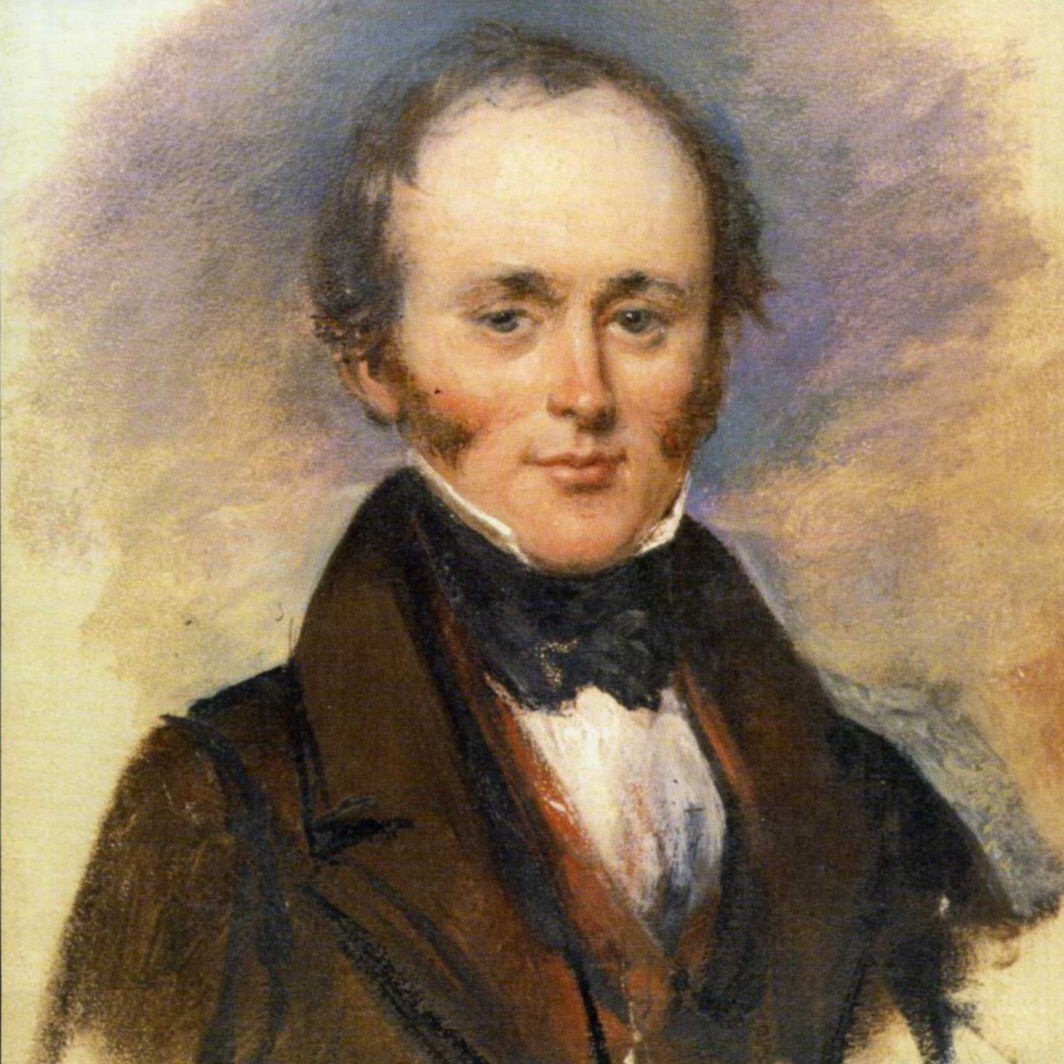
Charles Lyell at the British Association meeting in Glasgow 1840

From 1830 to 1833 Charles Lyell's multi-volume Principles of Geology was published. The work's subtitle was "An attempt to explain the former changes of the Earth's surface by reference to causes now in operation". He drew his explanations from field studies conducted directly before he went to work on the founding geology text, and developed Hutton's idea that the earth was shaped entirely by slow-moving forces still in operation today, acting over a very long period of time. The terms uniformitarianism for this idea, and catastrophism for the opposing viewpoint, was coined by William Whewell in a review of Lyell's book. Principles of Geology was the most influential geological work in the middle of the 19th century.

==== Systems of inorganic earth history ====
Geoscientists support diverse systems of Earth history, the nature of which rests on a certain mixture of views about the process, control, rate, and state which are preferred. Because geologists and geomorphologists tend to adopt opposite views over process, rate, and state in the inorganic world, there are eight different systems of beliefs in the development of the terrestrial sphere. All geoscientists stand by the principle of uniformity of law. Most, but not all, are directed by the principle of simplicity. All make definite assertions about the quality of rate and state in the inorganic realm.

Methodological assumption concerning kind of process	Substantive claim concerning state	Substantive claim Concerning rate	System of Inorganic Earth history	Promoters
Same Kind of processes that exist today Actualism	Steady State; Non-directionalism	Constant Rate; Gradualism	Actualistic; Non-directional; Gradualism	Most of Hutton, Playfair, Lyell
Same Kind of processes that exist today Actualism	Steady State; Non-directionalism	Changing Rate; Catastrophism	Actualistic; Non-directional; Catastrophism	Hall
Same Kind of processes that exist today Actualism	Changing State; Directionalism	Constant Rate; Gradualism	Actualistic; Directional; Gradualism	Small part of Hutton, Cotta, Darwin
Same Kind of processes that exist today Actualism	Changing State; Directionalism	Changing Rate; Catastrophism	Actualistic; Directional; Catastrophism	Hooke, Steno, Lehmann, Pallas, de Saussure, Werner, and geognosists, Elis de Beaumont and followers
Different Kind of processes than exist today Non-Actualism	Steady State; Non-directionalism	Constant Rate; Gradualism	Non-Actualistic; Non-directional; Gradualism	Carpenter
Different Kind of processes than exist today Non-Actualism	Steady State; Non-directionalism	Changing Rate; Catastrophism	Non-Actualistic; Non-directional; Catastrophism	Bonnet, Cuvier
Different Kind of processes than exist today Non-Actualism	Changing State; Directionalism	Constant Rate; Gradualism	Non-Actualistic directional Gradualism	De Mallet, Buffon
Different Kind of processes than exist today Non-Actualism	Changing State; Directionalism	Changing Rate; Catastrophism	Non-Actualistic; Directional; Catastrophism	Restoration cosmogonists, English diluvialists, Scriptural geologists

==== Lyell ====
Lyell's uniformitarianism is a family of four related propositions, not a single idea:

- Uniformity of law – the laws of nature are constant across time and space.
- Uniformity of methodology – the appropriate hypotheses for explaining the geological past are those with analogy today.
- Uniformity of kind – past and present causes are all of the same kind, have the same energy, and produce the same effects.
- Uniformity of degree – geological circumstances have remained the same over time.

None of these connotations requires another, and they are not all equally inferred by uniformitarians.

Gould explained Lyell's propositions in Time's Arrow, Time's Cycle (1987), stating that Lyell conflated two different types of propositions: a pair of methodological assumptions with a pair of substantive hypotheses. The four together make up Lyell's uniformitarianism.

===== Methodological assumptions =====
The two methodological assumptions below are accepted to be true by the majority of scientists and geologists. Gould claims that these philosophical propositions must be assumed before you can proceed as a scientist doing science. "You cannot go to a rocky outcrop and observe either the constancy of nature's laws or the working of unknown processes. It works the other way around." You first assume these propositions and "then you go to the outcrop."

- Uniformity of law across time and space: Natural laws are constant across space and time.

The axiom of uniformity of law is necessary in order for scientists to extrapolate (by inductive inference) into the unobservable past. The constancy of natural laws must be assumed in the study of the past; else we cannot meaningfully study it.

- Uniformity of process across time and space: Natural processes are constant across time and space.

Though similar to uniformity of law, this second a priori assumption, shared by the vast majority of scientists, deals with geological causes, not physicochemical laws. The past is to be explained by processes acting currently in time and space rather than inventing extra esoteric or unknown processes without good reason, otherwise known as parsimony or Occam's razor.

===== Substantive hypotheses =====
The substantive hypotheses were controversial and, in some cases, accepted by few. These hypotheses are judged true or false on empirical grounds through scientific observation and repeated experimental data. This is in contrast with the previous two philosophical assumptions that come before one can do science and so cannot be tested or falsified by science.

- Uniformity of rate across time and space: Change is typically slow, steady, and gradual.

Uniformity of rate (or gradualism) is what most people (including geologists) think of when they hear the word "uniformitarianism", confusing this hypothesis with the entire definition. As late as 1990, Lemon, in his textbook of stratigraphy, affirmed that "The uniformitarian view of earth history held that all geologic processes proceed continuously and at a very slow pace."

Gould explained Hutton's view of uniformity of rate; mountain ranges or grand canyons are built by the accumulation of nearly insensible changes added up through vast time. Some major events such as floods, earthquakes, and eruptions, do occur. But these catastrophes are strictly local. They neither occurred in the past nor shall happen in the future, at any greater frequency or extent than they display at present. In particular, the whole earth is never convulsed at once.

- Uniformity of state across time and space: Change is evenly distributed throughout space and time.

The uniformity of state hypothesis implies that throughout the history of our earth there is no progress in any inexorable direction. The planet has almost always looked and behaved as it does now. Change is continuous but leads nowhere. The earth is in balance: a dynamic steady state.

=== 20th century ===
Stephen Jay Gould's first scientific paper, "Is uniformitarianism necessary?" (1965), reduced these four assumptions to two. He dismissed the first principle, which asserted spatial and temporal invariance of natural laws, as no longer an issue of debate. He rejected the third (uniformity of rate) as an unjustified limitation on scientific inquiry, as it constrains past geologic rates and conditions to those of the present. So, Lyell's uniformitarianism was deemed unnecessary.

Uniformitarianism was proposed in contrast to catastrophism, which states that the distant past "consisted of epochs of paroxysmal and catastrophic action interposed between periods of comparative tranquility." Especially in the late 19th and early 20th centuries, most geologists took this interpretation to mean that catastrophic events are not important in geologic time; one example of this is the debate of the formation of the Channeled Scablands due to the catastrophic Missoula glacial outburst floods. An important result of this debate and others was the re-clarification that, while the same principles operate in geologic time, catastrophic events that are infrequent on human time-scales can have important consequences in geologic history. Derek Ager has noted that "geologists do not deny uniformitarianism in its true sense, that is to say, of interpreting the past by means of the processes that are seen going on at the present day, so long as we remember that the periodic catastrophe is one of those processes. Those periodic catastrophes make more showing in the stratigraphical record than we have hitherto assumed."

Modern geologists do not apply uniformitarianism in the same way as Lyell. They question if rates of processes were uniform through time and only those values measured during the history of geology are to be accepted. The present may not be a long enough key to penetrating the deep lock of the past. Geologic processes may have been active at different rates in the past that humans have not observed. "By force of popularity, uniformity of rate has persisted to our present day. For more than a century, Lyell's rhetoric conflating axiom with hypotheses has descended in unmodified form. Many geologists have been stifled by the belief that proper methodology includes an a priori commitment to gradual change, and by a preference for explaining large-scale phenomena as the concatenation of innumerable tiny changes."

The current consensus is that Earth's history is a slow, gradual process punctuated by occasional natural catastrophic events that have affected Earth and its inhabitants. In practice it is reduced from Lyell's conflation, or blending, to simply the two philosophical assumptions. This is also known as the principle of geological actualism, which states that all past geological action was like all present geological action. The principle of actualism is the cornerstone of paleoecology.

== Social sciences ==
Uniformitarianism has also been applied in historical linguistics, where it is considered a foundational principle of the field. Linguist Donald Ringe gives the following definition:

If language was normally acquired in the past in the same way as it is today – usually by native acquisition in early childhood – and if it was used in the same ways – to transmit information, to express solidarity with family, friends, and neighbors, to mark one's social position, etc. – then it must have had the same general structure and organization in the past as it does today, and it must have changed in the same ways as it does today.

The principle is known in linguistics, after William Labov and associates, as the Uniformitarian Principle or Unifomitarian Hypothesis.

== See also ==
- Conservation law
- Noether's theorem
- Law of universal gravitation
- Astronomical spectroscopy
- Cosmological principle
- History of paleontology
- Paradigm shift
- Physical constant
- Physical cosmology
- Scientific consensus
- Time-variation of fundamental constants
