= James Saxon (painter) =

English painter (1772 – c. 1819)

James Saxon (1772 – in or after 1819) was an English portrait painter.

== Life ==
Born in Manchester, he was son of John Saxon. He entered Manchester grammar school in January 1783. In 1797, he was in practice as a portrait-painter at 4 York Street, Manchester; shortly afterwards, he moved to London. He visited Scotland in 1805.

Saxon later went to St. Petersburg, where he practised successfully for several years. On his return, he spent a short time in Glasgow, when he painted a portrait of David Hamilton the architect. He finally settled again in London, where he died.

== Works ==
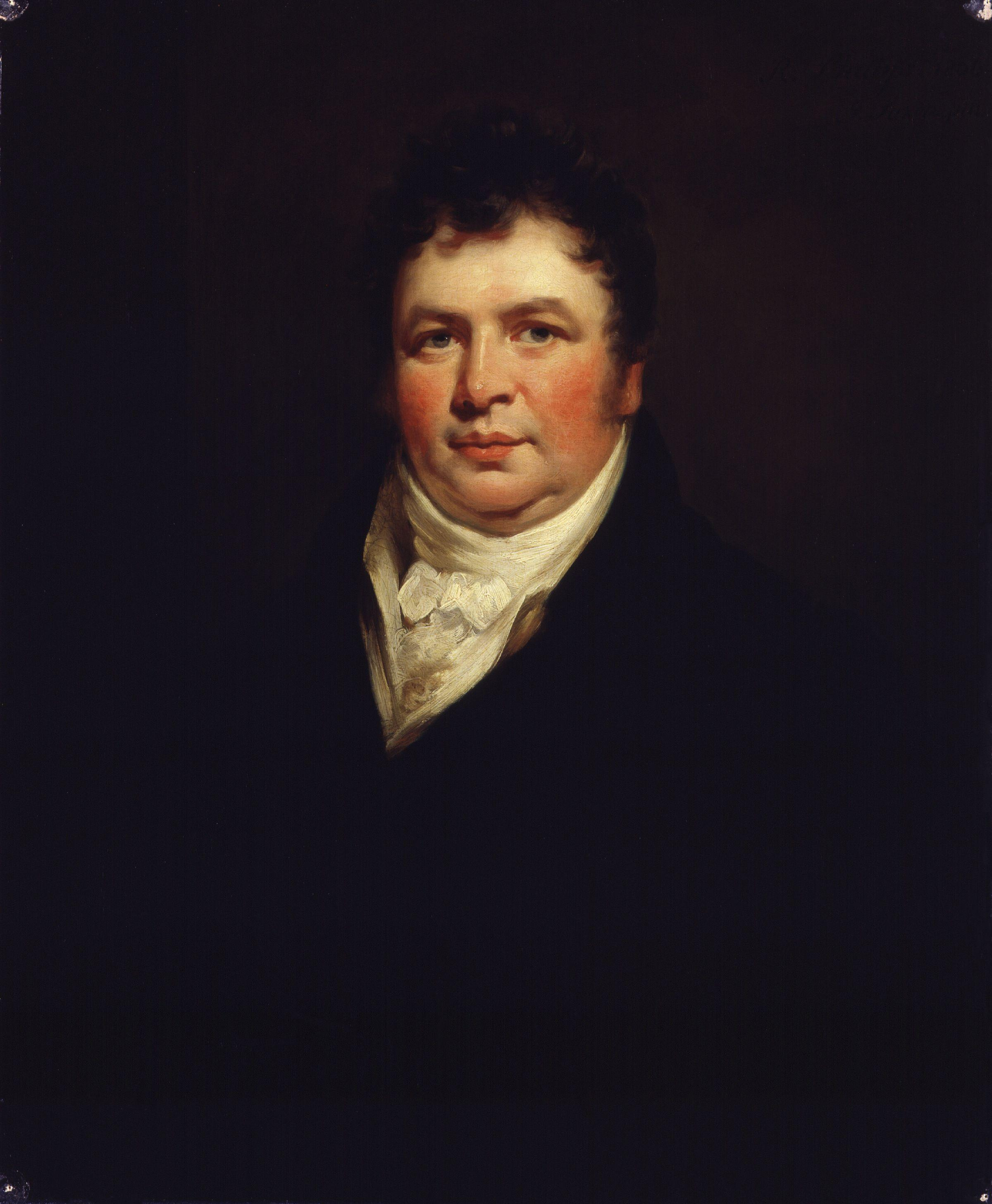
James Saxon, portrait of Sir Richard Phillips, in the National Portrait Gallery, London

Saxon's portraits show the influence of John Opie. He exhibited at the Royal Academy in 1795 and 1796, and a total of 17 portraits by 1817.

The portrait of John Clerk of Eldin from 1805 has a background showing a system of naval evolution conceived by Clerk, by William Anderson (1757–1837); it went to the Scottish National Portrait Gallery. In the same year, he painted a portrait of Sir Walter Scott, which was engraved in stipple by James Heath, as an illustration to The Lady of the Lake (1810). A companion portrait (1810) of Lady Scott was engraved by George Baird Shaw for John Gibson Lockhart's Life of Scott.
