= Uniformitarian principle (linguistics) =

Principle that observable language change processes also operated historically

In historical linguistics, the uniformitarian principle is the assumption that processes of language change that can be observed today also operated in the past. Peter Trudgill calls the uniformitarian principle "one of the fundamental bases of modern historical linguistics," which he characterizes, other things being equal, as the principle "that knowledge of processes that operated in the past can be inferred by observing ongoing processes in the present." It is the linguistic adaptation of a widespread principle in the sciences, there usually known as uniformitarianism.

== Application in linguistics ==
In linguistics, Uriel Weinreich, William Labov and Marvin Herzog appear to have been the first to expressly elaborate, in the 1960s, on a hitherto tacit assumption of equivalent processes being at play in the present time as in the past. They did not do so without precedent, however, as historical and comparative linguistics, from the late 18th century on, seem to have adopted such process-oriented thinking. Hermann Paul, for instance, assumed what he the called "psychological" principles in the 1860s as underlying language change. William Labov's "Principles of Language Change, Part 1: Internal Factors," from 1994, gives probably the most coherent account to date by expressly linking the Uniformitarian Principle to geological uniformitarianism and expressing the parallels. Around the same time William Dwight Whitney wrote of "So far back as we can trace the history of language, the forces which have been efficient in producing its changes ... have been the same". Labov summarizes the state-of-the-art: "Today, it would seem that linguistics has accepted the uniformitarian principle and its consequences, as geology, biology, and other historical sciences have done."

=== Sociolinguistics and language varieties ===
The Uniformitarian Principle is often applied in sociolinguistics. J. K. Chambers mentions it as a benchmark in his Sociolinguistic Theory, which draws on Labov's summary. Recently, the Uniformitarian Principle has been revoked to alert scholars to the "way English linguists construe pluricentricity" as "the anti-thesis of its treatment by a substantial number of German linguists" today. In Pluricentricity Debate, Dollinger argues that "the unity of cross-linguistic dialectology" is "threatened" by (German) disregard for the Uniformitarian Hypothesis: if multiple standards in English are allowed and the social constraints are similar in other languages, the Uniformitarian Hypothesis demands that sociolinguists allow for multiple standards in theses contexts too, e.g. Austrian Standard German, German Standard German and Swiss Standard German.
