= Glen Tilt =

Glen in Perth and Kinross

Glen Tilt Gleann Teilt (Scottish Gaelic)
- Glen
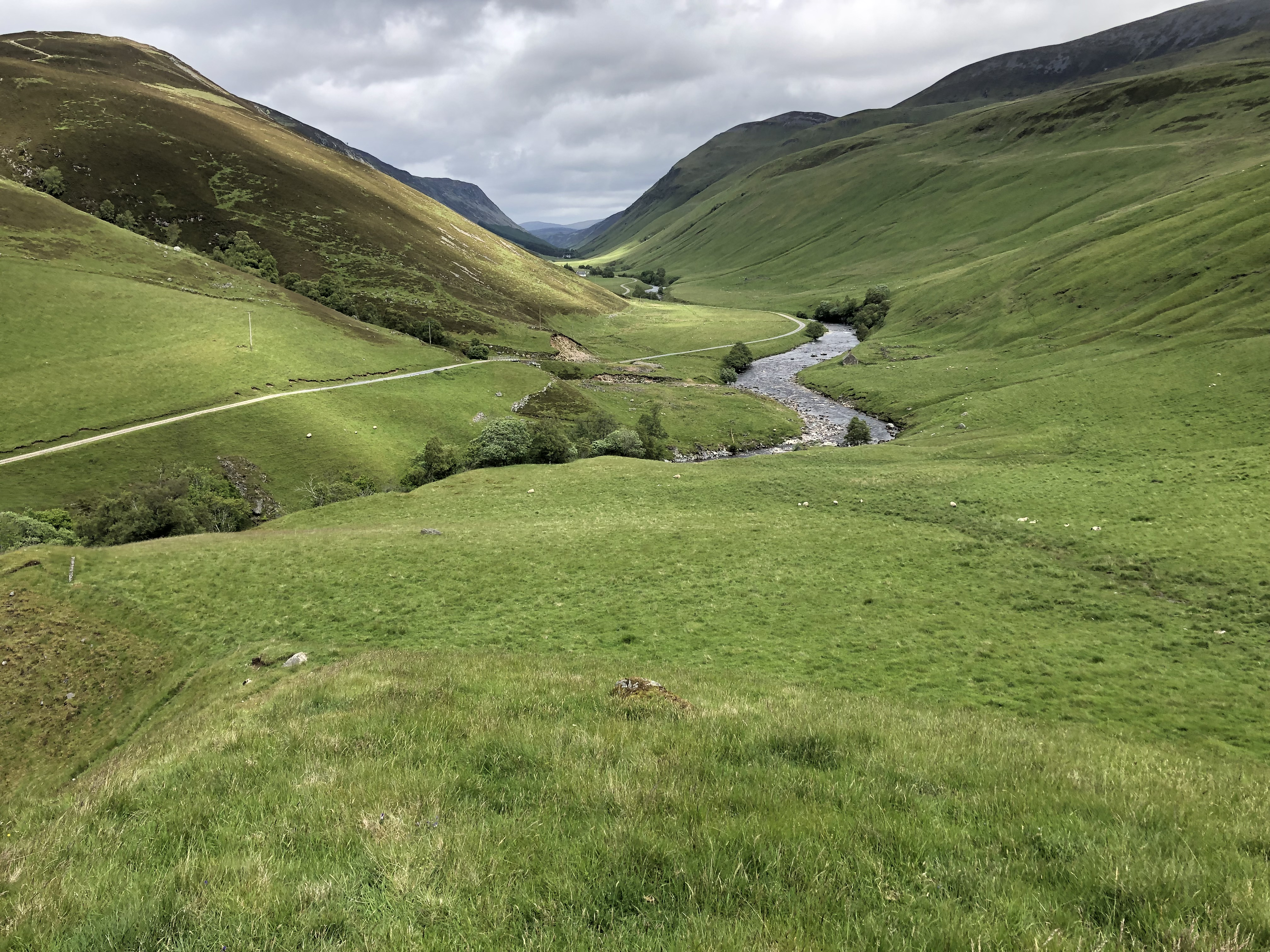
- Glen Tilt June 2019

- Location within Scotland
- Coordinates: 56°49′59″N 03°46′34″W
- Grid position: NN 91731 72687
- Location: Perth and Kinross, Scotland

Glen Tilt (Scottish Gaelic: Gleann Teilt) is a glen in the extreme north of Perth and Kinross, Scotland. Beginning at the confines of Aberdeenshire, it follows a South-westerly direction excepting for the last 4 miles, when it runs due south to Blair Atholl. It is watered throughout by the Tilt, which enters the Garry after a course of 14 miles, and receives on its right the Tarf, which forms some falls just above the confluence, and on the left the Fender, which has some falls also. The attempt of George Murray, 6th Duke of Atholl to close the glen to the public was successfully contested by the Scottish Rights of Way Society in 1847. The massive mountain of Beinn a' Ghlò and its three Munros Càrn nan Gabhar (1129 m), Bràigh Coire Chruinn-bhalgain (1070 m) and Càrn Liath (975) dominate the glen's eastern lower half.

Perthshire is the historic county that Glen Tilt was within, Perth was the county town.

Marble of good quality is occasionally quarried in the glen, and the rock formation has long attracted the attention of geologists.

== Royal banquet for James V, 1532 ==
A chronicle written by Robert Lindsay of Pitscottie in the 1570s describes a banquet prepared by the Earl of Atholl for James V to impress a Papal ambassador. This event seems to have taken place in 1532 in a temporary wooden lodge built like a castle in Glen Tilt. The lodging was burnt at the end of the event. Mary, Queen of Scots visited Glen Tilt in August 1564, and wrote a letter from the "Lunkartis in Glentilth" to her ally Colin Campbell of Glenorchy.

== History of Geology ==
James Hutton, the pioneer geologist, visited the glen in 1785 and found boulders with granite penetrating metamorphic schists in a way which indicated that the granite had been molten at the time. This showed to him that granite formed from cooling of molten rock, contradicting the ideas of Neptunism of that time that theorised that rocks were formed by precipitation out of water. Hutton concluded that the granite must be younger than the schists. This was one of the findings that led him to develop his theory of Plutonism and the concept of an immensely long geologic time scale with "no vestige of a beginning, no prospect of an end."

Sir John Clerk of Eldin visited the site and produced geological drawings of the area, immediately upstream of the old Dail-An-Eas Bridge which has since collapsed but the abutments remain as a listed building.

== Gallery ==
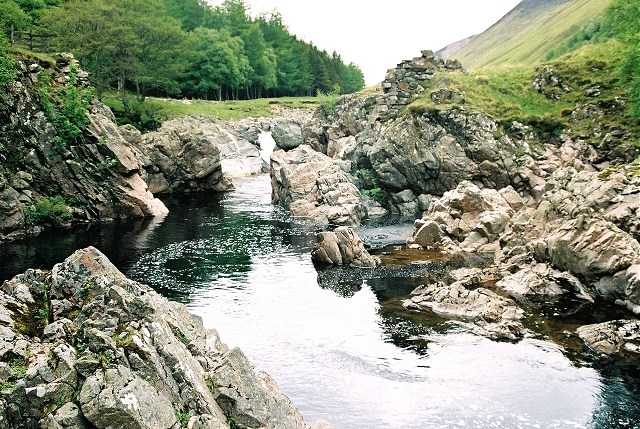
Hutton's Locality. It was from the Dail-an-eas bridge which used to span the river at this point that James Hutton found the evidence he was seeking that molten granite had intruded the country rocks. Location: 56.851082°N 3.741822°W

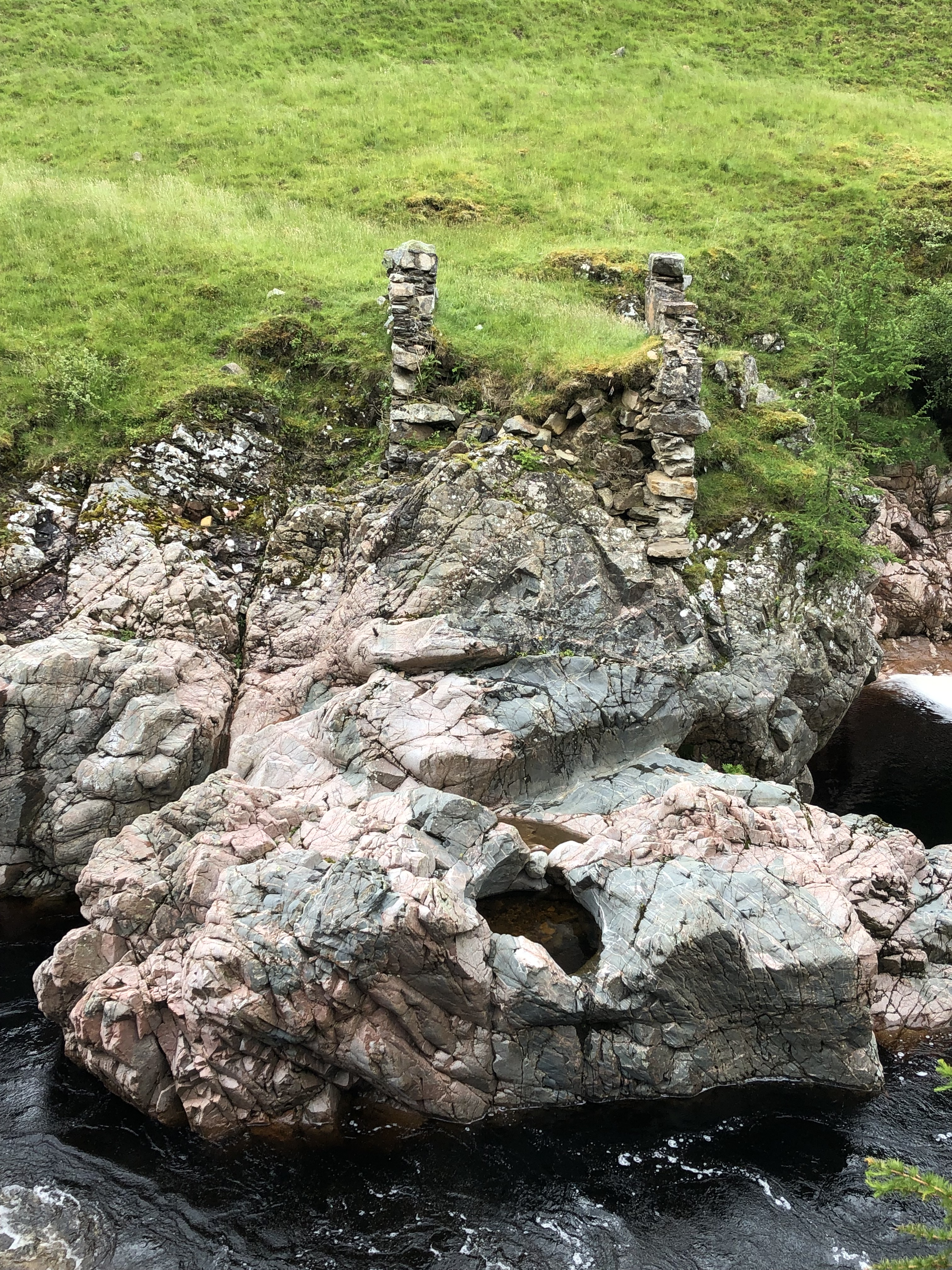
Hutton's Glen Tilt geological exposure at collapsed Dail-an-eas Bridge upstream from Forest Lodge, drawn by John Clerk of Eldin in 1785. Location: 56.8511°N 3.7418°W

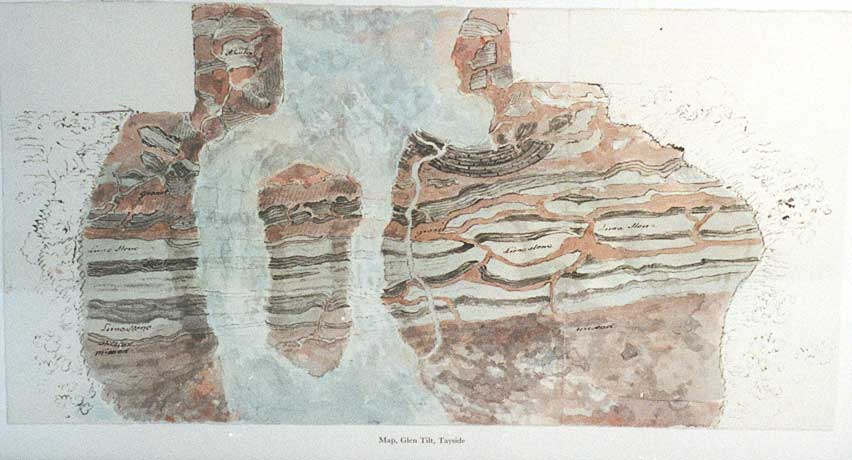
Watercolour image by John Clerk of Eldin of the key exposure at Glen Tilt. The flow direction of the river is towards the top of the image, in a southwesterly direction. The rectangular areas at the top of the image are the foundations of the collapsed bridge.

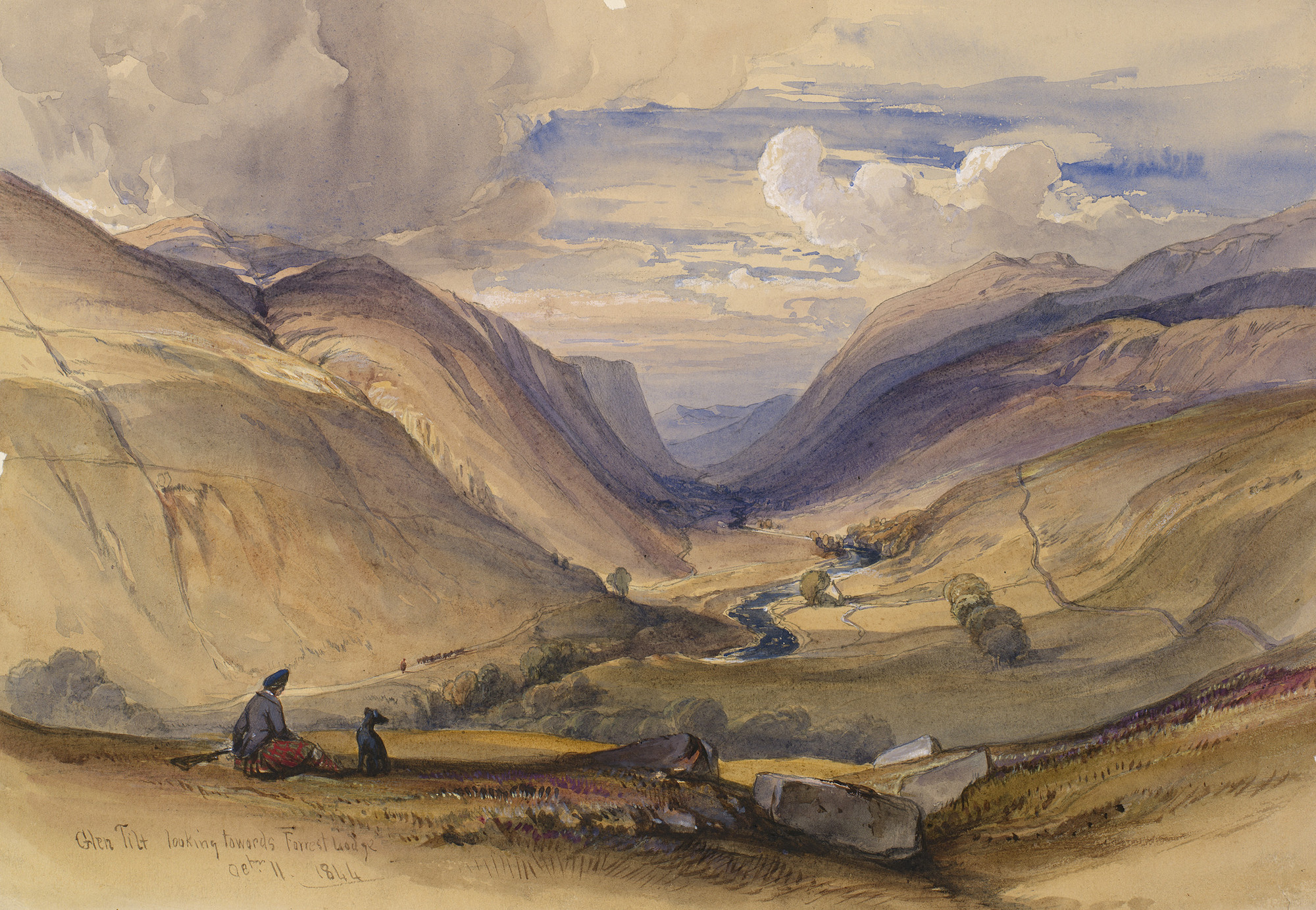
1844 watercolour of Glen Tilt by William Leighton Leitch

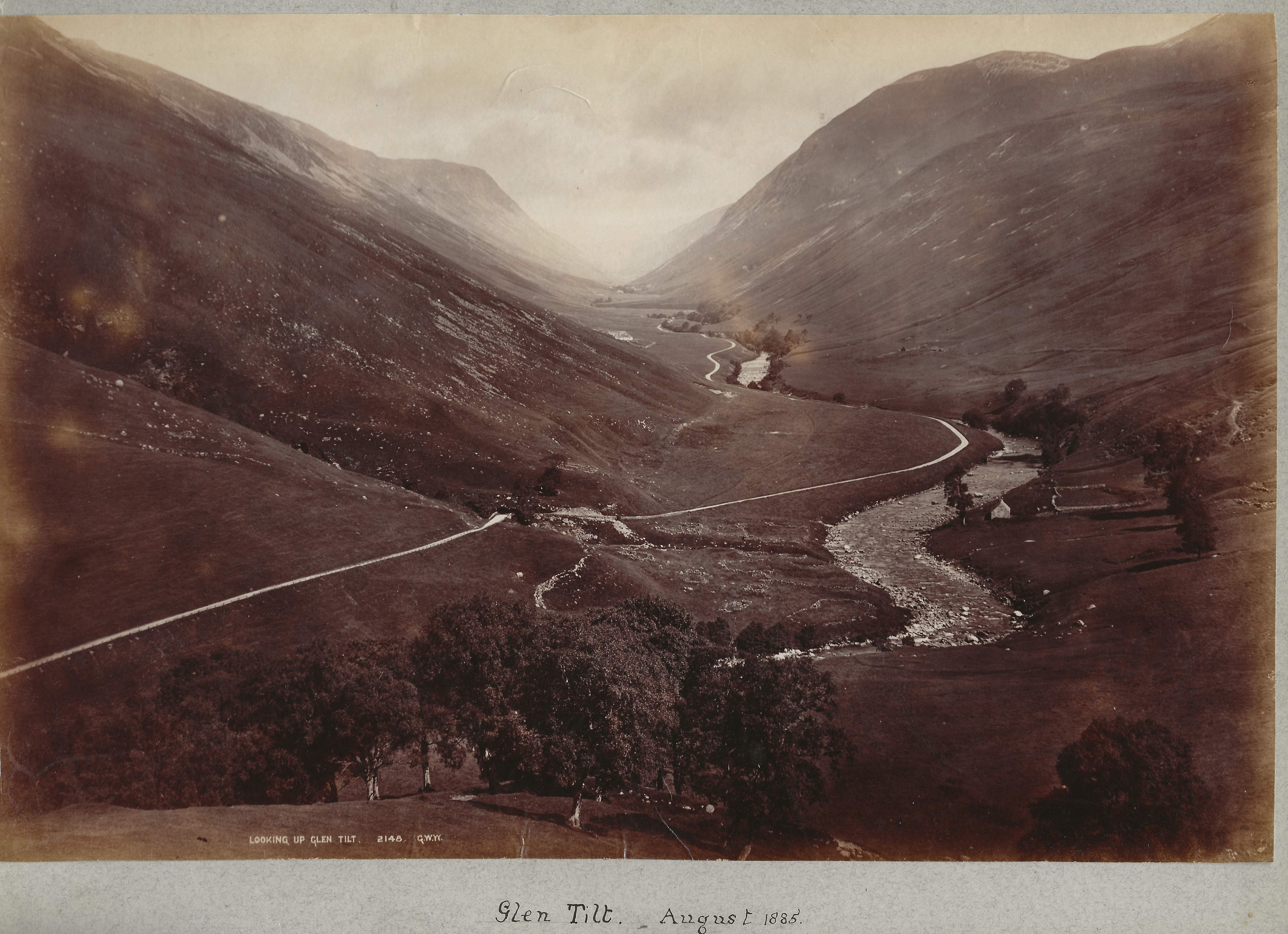
George Washington Wilson's August 1885 photograph of the Glen Tilt looking upstream toward Forest Lodge
