= James Hutton =

Scottish geologist, agriculturalist, chemical manufacturer (1726–1797)

James Hutton FRSE
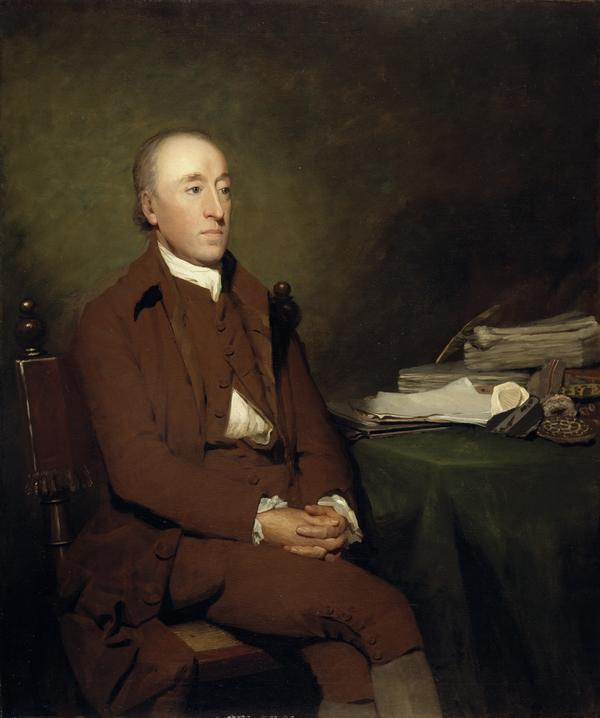
- Portrait by Henry Raeburn, 1776
- Born: 3 June 1726; Edinburgh, Scotland
- Died: 26 March 1797 (aged 70); Edinburgh, Scotland
- Education: University of Edinburgh; University of Paris
- Known for: Plutonic geology Uniformitarianism Unconformity Deep time
- Scientific career
- Fields: Geology

Notes
- Member of the Royal Society of Agriculture of France

James Hutton ( /ˈhʌtən/; 3 June O.S. 1726 – 26 March 1797) was a Scottish geologist, agriculturalist, chemical manufacturer, naturalist and physician. Often referred to as the "Father of Modern Geology," he played a key role in establishing geology as a modern science.

Hutton advanced the idea that the physical world's remote history can be inferred from evidence in present-day rocks. Through his study of features in the landscape and coastlines of his native Scottish Lowlands, such as Salisbury Crags and Siccar Point, he developed the theory that geological features could not be static but underwent continuing transformation over indefinitely long periods of time. From this he argued, in agreement with many other early geologists, that the Earth could not be young. He was one of the earliest proponents of what in the 1830s became known as uniformitarianism, the science which explains features of the Earth's crust as the outcome of continuing natural processes over the long geologic time scale. Hutton also put forward a thesis for a 'system of the habitable Earth' proposed as a deistic mechanism designed to keep the world eternally suitable for humans, an early attempt to formulate what today might be called one kind of anthropic principle.

Some reflections similar to those of Hutton can be found in publications of his contemporaries, such as the French naturalist Georges-Louis Leclerc de Buffon, but it is chiefly Hutton's pioneering work that established the field.

== Early life and career ==
Hutton was born in Edinburgh on 3 June O.S. 1726, as one of five children of Sarah Balfour and William Hutton, a merchant who was Edinburgh City Treasurer. Hutton's father died in 1729, when he was three.

He was educated at the High School of Edinburgh where he was particularly interested in mathematics and chemistry, then when he was 14 he attended the University of Edinburgh as a "student of humanity", studying the classics. He was apprenticed to the lawyer George Chalmers WS when he was 17, but took more interest in chemical experiments than legal work. At the age of 18, he became a physician's assistant, and attended lectures in medicine at the University of Edinburgh.

After a two-year stay in Paris, James Hutton arrived in Leiden in 1749, where he enrolled at the University of Leiden on 14 August 1749, at the home of the then rector magnificus Joachim Schwartz to obtain a doctorate in medicine. He stayed with the widow Van der Tas (née Judith Bouvat) at the Langebrug, which corresponds to the current address Langebrug 101 in Leiden. His supervisor was Professor Frederik Winter, who was not only a professor at Leiden University, but also court physician to the Stadholder. The Latin manuscript of Hutton's dissertation also contained 92 theses, two of which were successfully defended in public by James Hutton on 3 September 1749. On 12 September 1749, James Hutton obtained his doctorate in medicine from Leiden University with a physico-medical thesis entitled Sanguine et Circulatione Microcosmi. The thesis was printed by Wilhelmus Boot, book printer in Leiden. It is believed that James Hutton returned to Britain shortly after his promotion.

After his degree Hutton went to London, then in mid-1750 returned to Edinburgh and resumed chemical experiments with close friend, John Davie. Their work on production of sal ammoniac from soot led to their partnership in a profitable chemical works, manufacturing the crystalline salt which was used for dyeing, metalworking and as smelling salts and had been available only from natural sources and had to be imported from Egypt. Hutton owned and rented out properties in Edinburgh, employing a factor to manage this business.

=== Farming and geology ===
Hutton inherited from his father the Berwickshire farms of Slighhouses, a lowland farm which had been in the family since 1713, and the hill farm of Nether Monynut. In the early 1750s he moved to Slighhouses and set about making improvements, introducing farming practices from other parts of Britain and experimenting with plant and animal husbandry. He recorded his ideas and innovations in an unpublished treatise on The Elements of Agriculture.

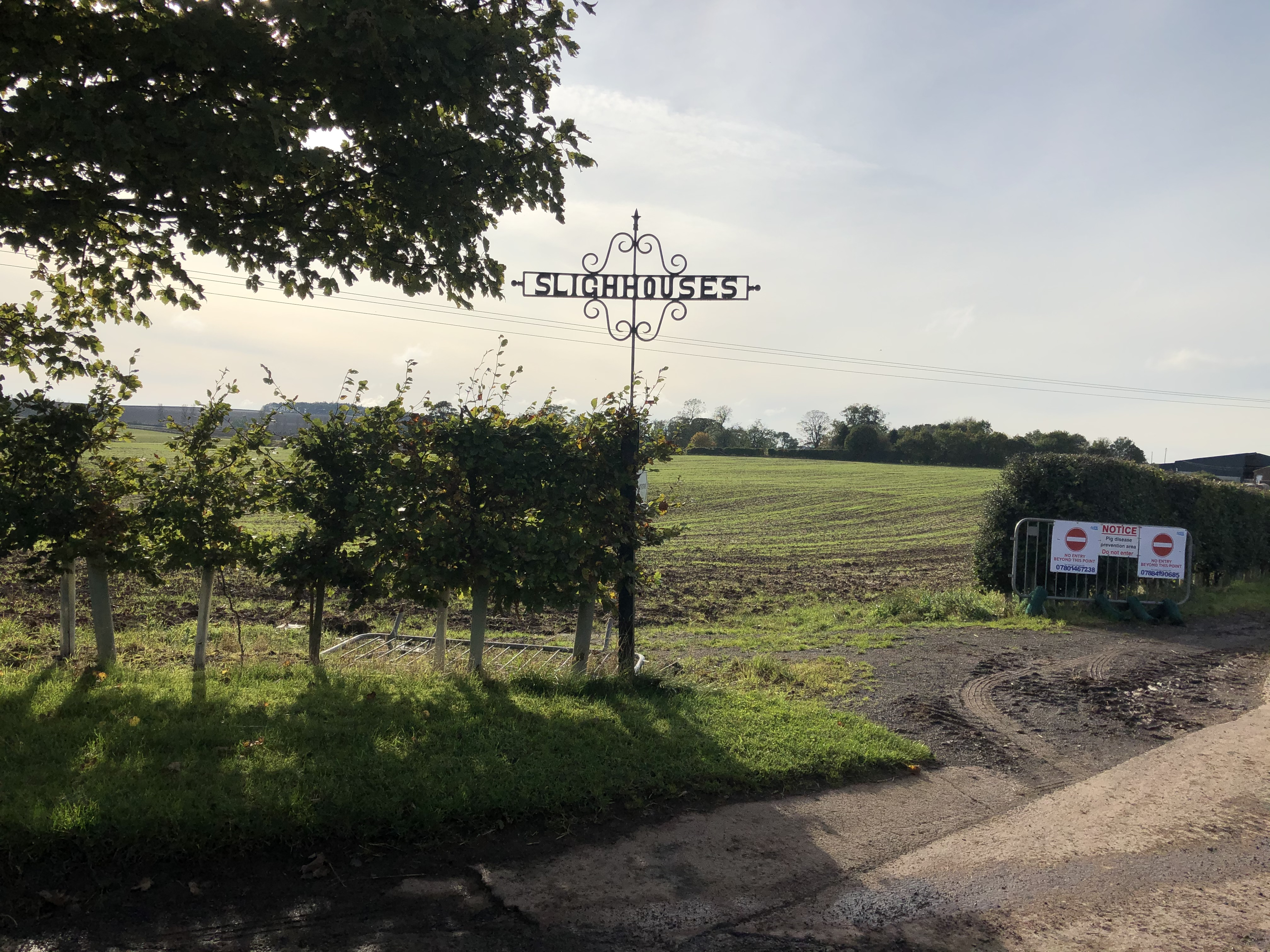
Front entrance to Hutton's farm Slighhouses. Location: 55.82675°N 2.28586°W

This developed his interest in meteorology and geology. In a 1753 letter he wrote that he had "become very fond of studying the surface of the earth, and was looking with anxious curiosity into every pit or ditch or bed of a river that fell in his way". Clearing and draining his farm provided ample opportunities. The mathematician John Playfair described Hutton as having noticed that "a vast proportion of the present rocks are composed of materials afforded by the destruction of bodies, animal, vegetable and mineral, of more ancient formation". His theoretical ideas began to come together in 1760. While his farming activities continued, in 1764 he went on a geological tour of the north of Scotland with George Clerk-Maxwell, ancestor of the famous James Clerk Maxwell.

=== Edinburgh and canal building ===
In 1768, Hutton returned to Edinburgh, letting his farms to tenants but continuing to take an interest in farm improvements and research which included experiments carried out at Slighhouses. He developed a red dye made from the roots of the madder plant.

He had a house built in 1770 at St John's Hill, Edinburgh, overlooking Salisbury Crags. This later became the Balfour family home and, in 1840, the birthplace of the psychiatrist James Crichton-Browne. Hutton was one of the most influential participants in the Scottish Enlightenment, and fell in with numerous first-class minds in the sciences including mathematician John Playfair, philosopher David Hume and economist Adam Smith. Hutton held no position in the University of Edinburgh and communicated his scientific findings through the Royal Society of Edinburgh. He was particularly friendly with physician and chemist Joseph Black, and together with Adam Smith they founded the Oyster Club for weekly meetings.

Between 1767 and 1774 Hutton had close involvement with the construction of the Forth and Clyde canal, making full use of his geological knowledge, both as a shareholder and as a member of the committee of management, and attended meetings including extended site inspections of all the works. At this time he is listed as living on Bernard Street in Leith. In 1777 he published a pamphlet on Considerations on the Nature, Quality and Distinctions of Coal and Culm which successfully helped to obtain relief from excise duty on carrying small coal.

In 1783, he was a joint founder of the Royal Society of Edinburgh.

== Later life and death ==
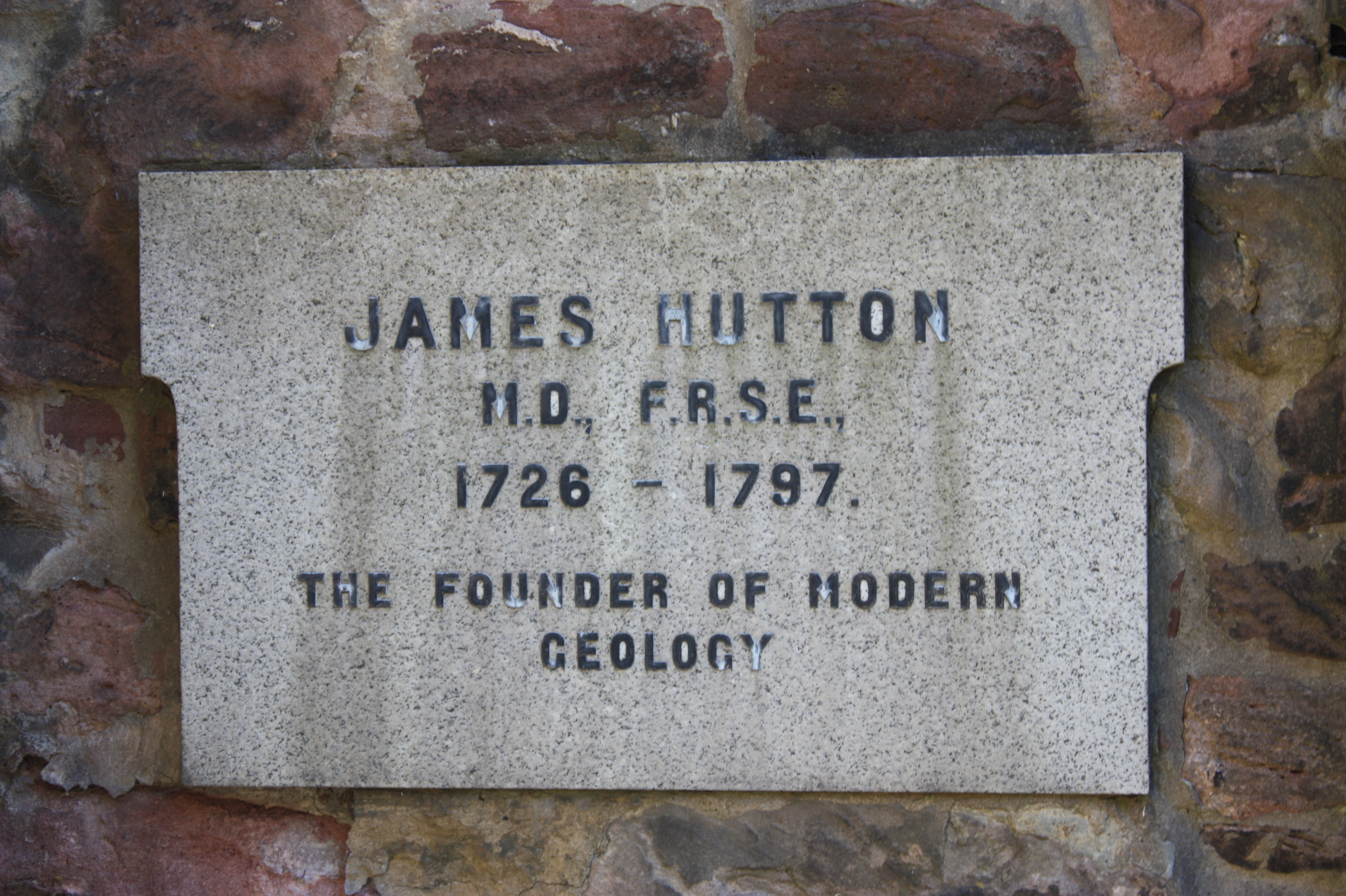
The memorial to James Hutton at his grave in Greyfriars Kirkyard in Edinburgh. Location: 55.945626°N 3.192200°W

From 1791 Hutton suffered extreme pain from stones in the bladder and gave up field work to concentrate on finishing his books. A dangerous and painful operation failed to resolve his illness. He died in Edinburgh and was buried in the vault of Andrew Balfour, opposite the vault of his friend Joseph Black, in the now sealed south-west section of Greyfriars Kirkyard in Edinburgh, commonly known as the Covenanter's Prison.

Hutton did not marry and had no legitimate children. Around 1747, he had a son by a Miss Edington, and though he gave his child, James Smeaton Hutton, financial assistance, he had little to do with the boy, who went on to become a post-office clerk in London.

== Theory of rock formations ==
Hutton developed several hypotheses to explain the rock formations he saw around him, but according to Playfair he "was in no haste to publish his theory; for he was one of those who are much more delighted with the contemplation of truth, than with the praise of having discovered it". After some 25 years of work, his Theory of the Earth; or an Investigation of the Laws observable in the Composition, Dissolution, and Restoration of Land upon the Globe was read to meetings of the Royal Society of Edinburgh in two parts, the first by his friend Joseph Black on 7 March 1785, and the second by himself on 4 April 1785. Hutton subsequently read an abstract of his dissertation Concerning the System of the Earth, its Duration and Stability to Society meeting on 4 July 1785, which he had printed and circulated privately. In it, he outlined his theory as follows;

The solid parts of the present land appear in general, to have been composed of the productions of the sea, and of other materials similar to those now found upon the shores. Hence we find reason to conclude:

1st, That the land on which we rest is not simple and original, but that it is a composition, and had been formed by the operation of second causes.
2nd, That before the present land was made, there had subsisted a world composed of sea and land, in which were tides and currents, with such operations at the bottom of the sea as now take place. And,

Lastly, That while the present land was forming at the bottom of the ocean, the former land maintained plants and animals; at least the sea was then inhabited by animals, in a similar manner as it is at present.
Hence we are led to conclude, that the greater part of our land, if not the whole had been produced by operations natural to this globe; but that in order to make this land a permanent body, resisting the operations of the waters, two things had been required;
1st, The consolidation of masses formed by collections of loose or incoherent materials;

2ndly, The elevation of those consolidated masses from the bottom of the sea, the place where they were collected, to the stations in which they now remain above the level of the ocean.

=== Search for evidence ===
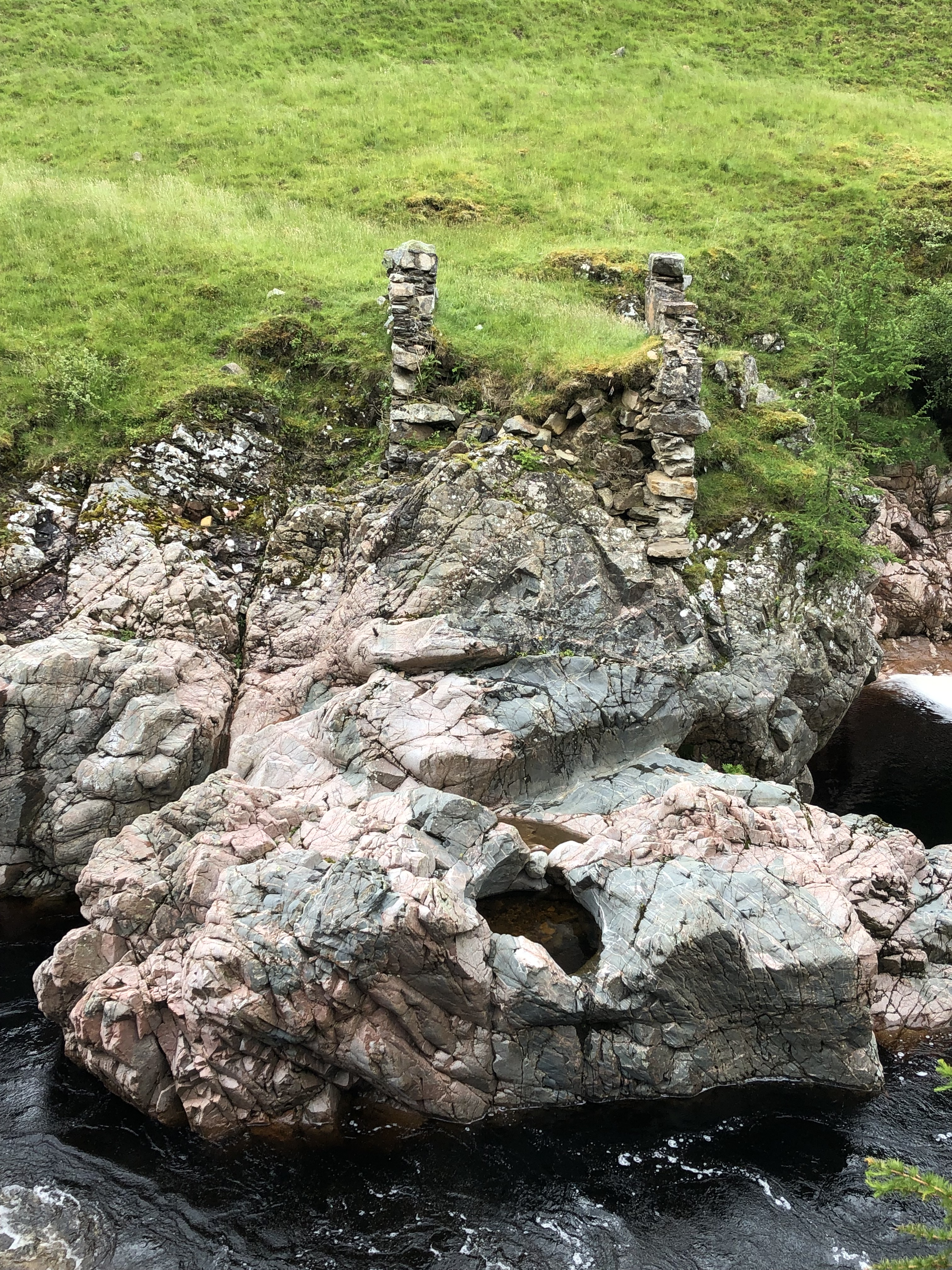
Hutton's Glen Tilt exposure at collapsed Dail-an-eas Bridge upstream from Forest Lodge, drawn by John Clerk of Eldin in 1785. The bridge collapsed in approximately 1973. Location: 56.851082°N 3.741822°W

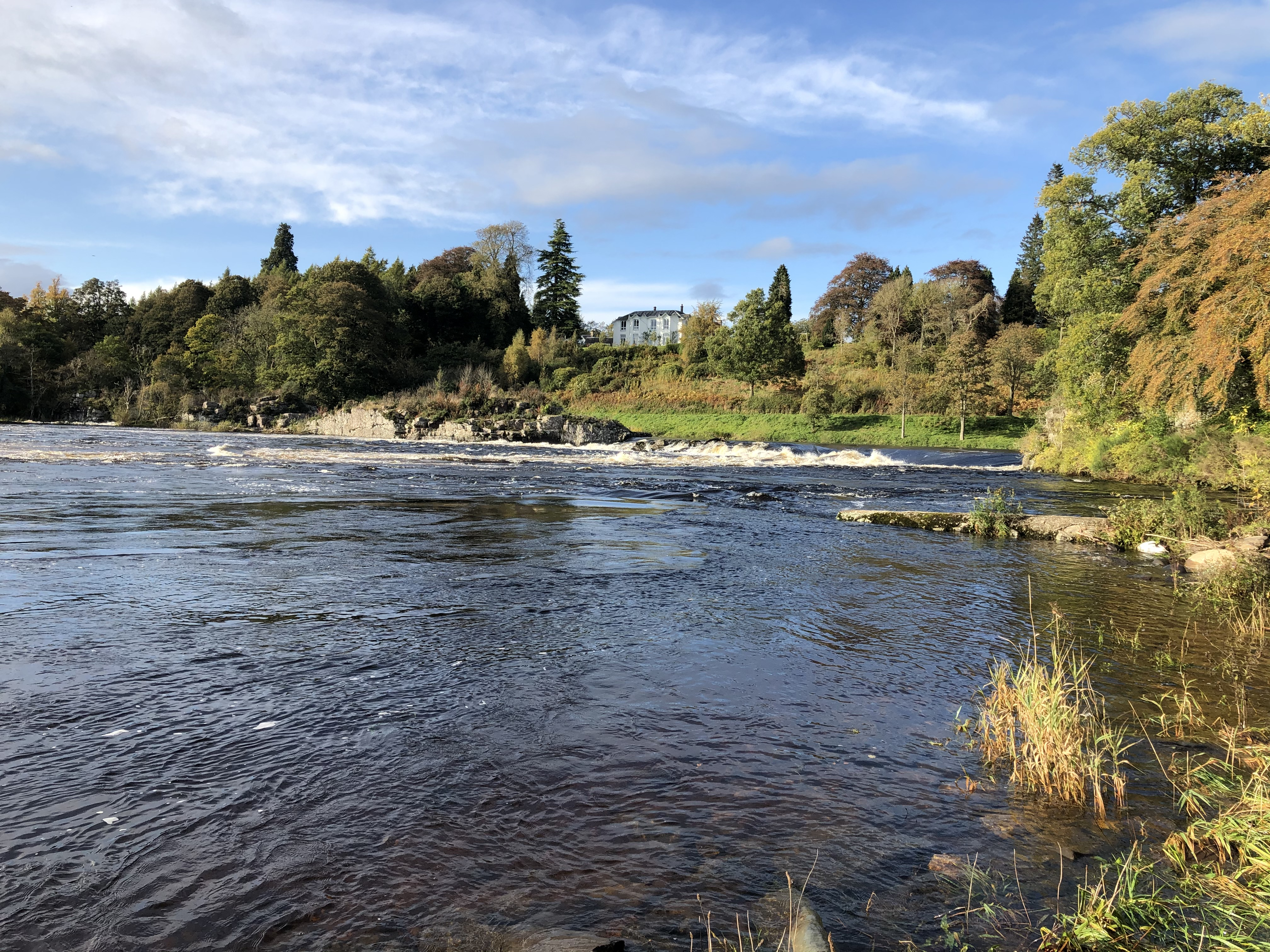
Intrusive dike eroded by the River Tay near Stobhall described by Hutton. Location: 56.48964°N 3.42455°W

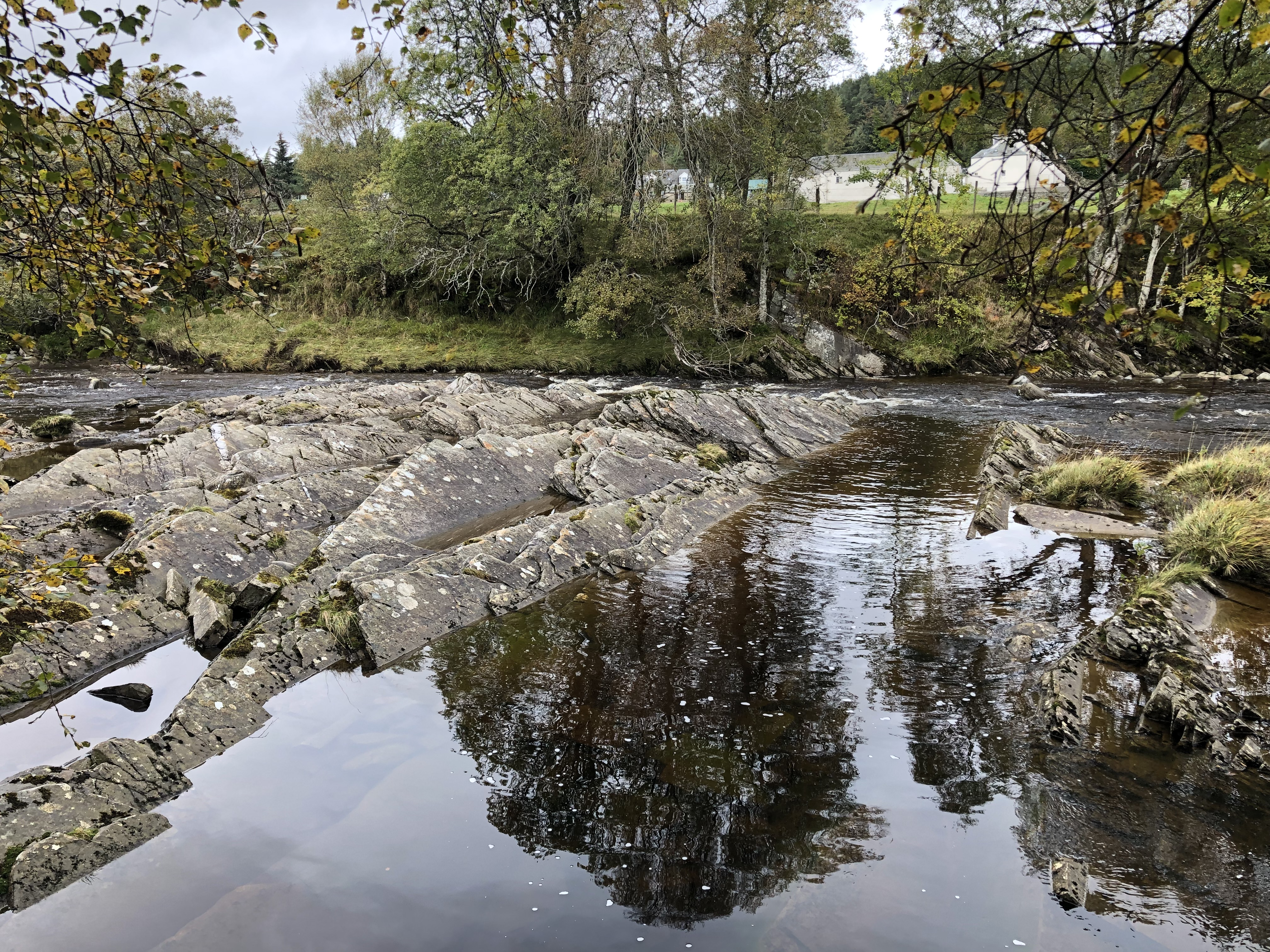
Geological dike eroded by the River Garry at Dalnacardoch described by Hutton and drawn by Clerk. Location: 56.880493°N 4.09473°W

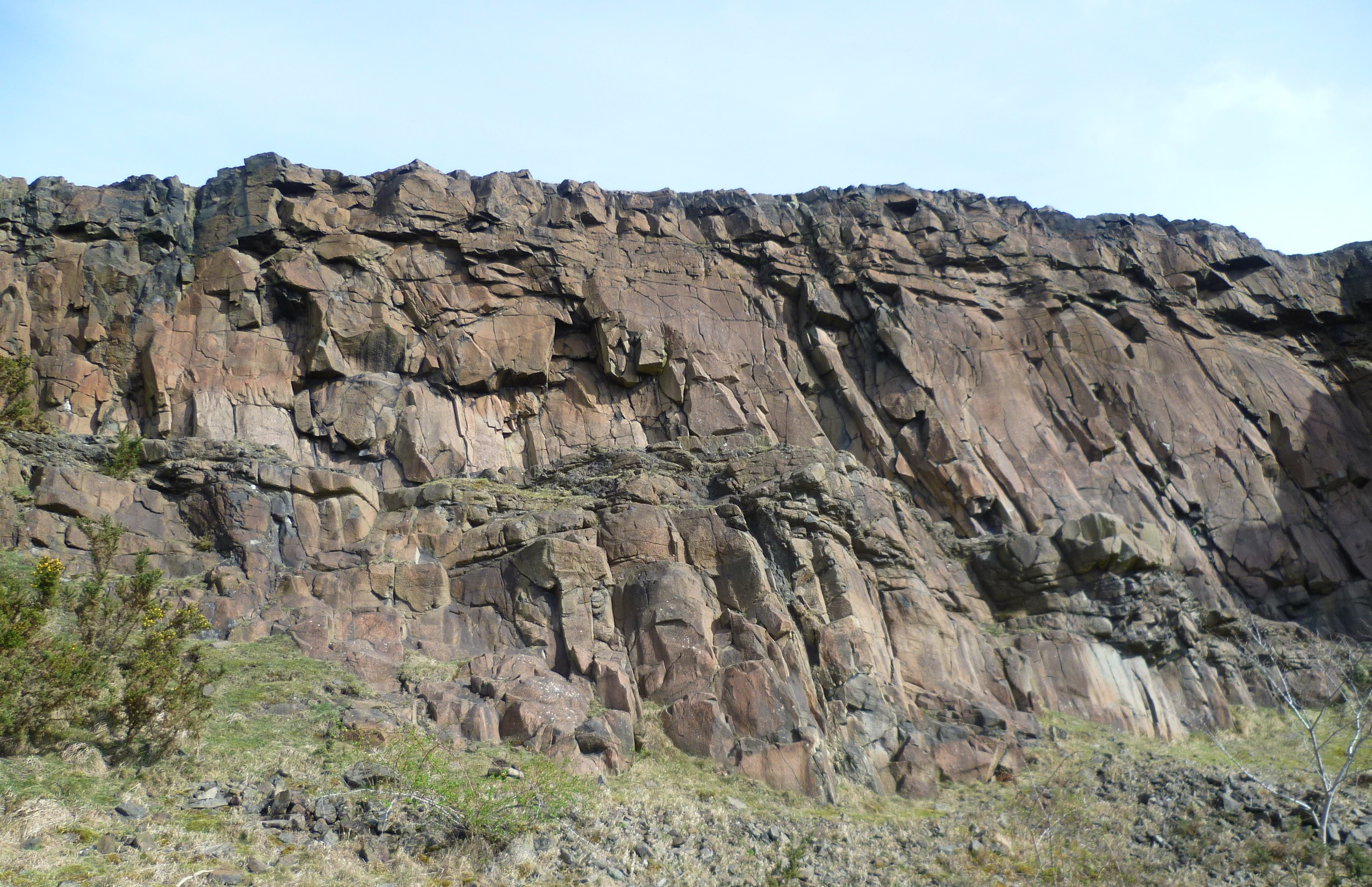
Hutton's Section on Edinburgh's Salisbury Crags. Location: 55.9432°N 3.1672°W

In the summer of 1785 at Glen Tilt and other sites in the Cairngorm mountains in the Scottish Highlands, Hutton found granite penetrating metamorphic schists, in a way which indicated that the granite had been molten at the time. This was Hutton's first geological field trip and he was invited by the Duke of Atholl to his hunting lodge, Forest Lodge. The exposures at the Dail-an-eas Bridge demonstrated to him that granite formed from the cooling of molten rock rather than it precipitating out of water as others at the time believed, and therefore the granite must be younger than the schists. Hutton presented his theory of the earth on 4 March and 7 April 1785, at the Royal Society of Edinburgh.

He went on to find a similar penetration of volcanic rock through sedimentary rock in Edinburgh, at Salisbury Crags, adjoining Arthur's Seat – this area of the Crags is now known as Hutton's Section. He found other examples in Galloway in 1786, and on the Isle of Arran in 1787.

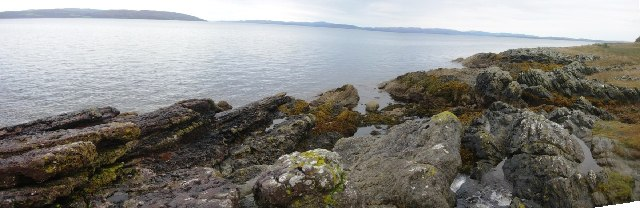
Hutton's Unconformity on Arran

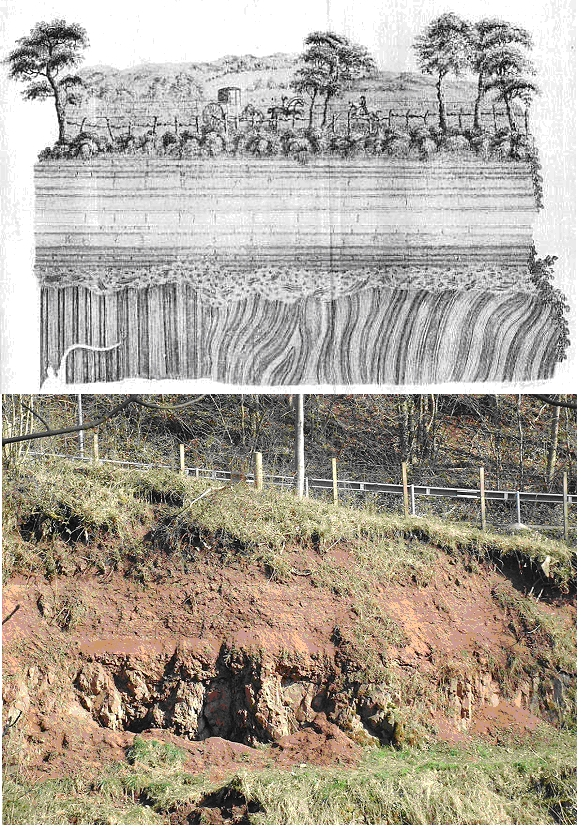
Hutton Unconformity at Jedburgh. Photograph (2003) below Clerk of Eldin illustration (1787). Location: 55.4721°N 2.5545°W

The existence of angular unconformities had been noted by Nicolas Steno and by French geologists including Horace-Bénédict de Saussure, who interpreted them in terms of Neptunism as "primary formations". Hutton wanted to examine such formations himself to see "particular marks" of the relationship between the rock layers. On the 1787 trip to the Isle of Arran he found his first example of Hutton's Unconformity to the north of Newton Point near Lochranza, but the limited view meant that the condition of the underlying strata was not clear enough for him, and he incorrectly thought that the strata were conformable at a depth below the exposed outcrop.

Later in 1787 Hutton noted what is now known as the Hutton or "Great" Unconformity at Inchbonny, Jedburgh, in layers of sedimentary rock. As shown in the illustrations to the right, layers of greywacke in the lower layers of the cliff face are tilted almost vertically, and above an intervening layer of conglomerate lie horizontal layers of Old Red Sandstone. He later wrote of how he "rejoiced at my good fortune in stumbling upon an object so interesting in the natural history of the earth, and which I had been long looking for in vain." That year, he found the same sequence in Teviotdale.

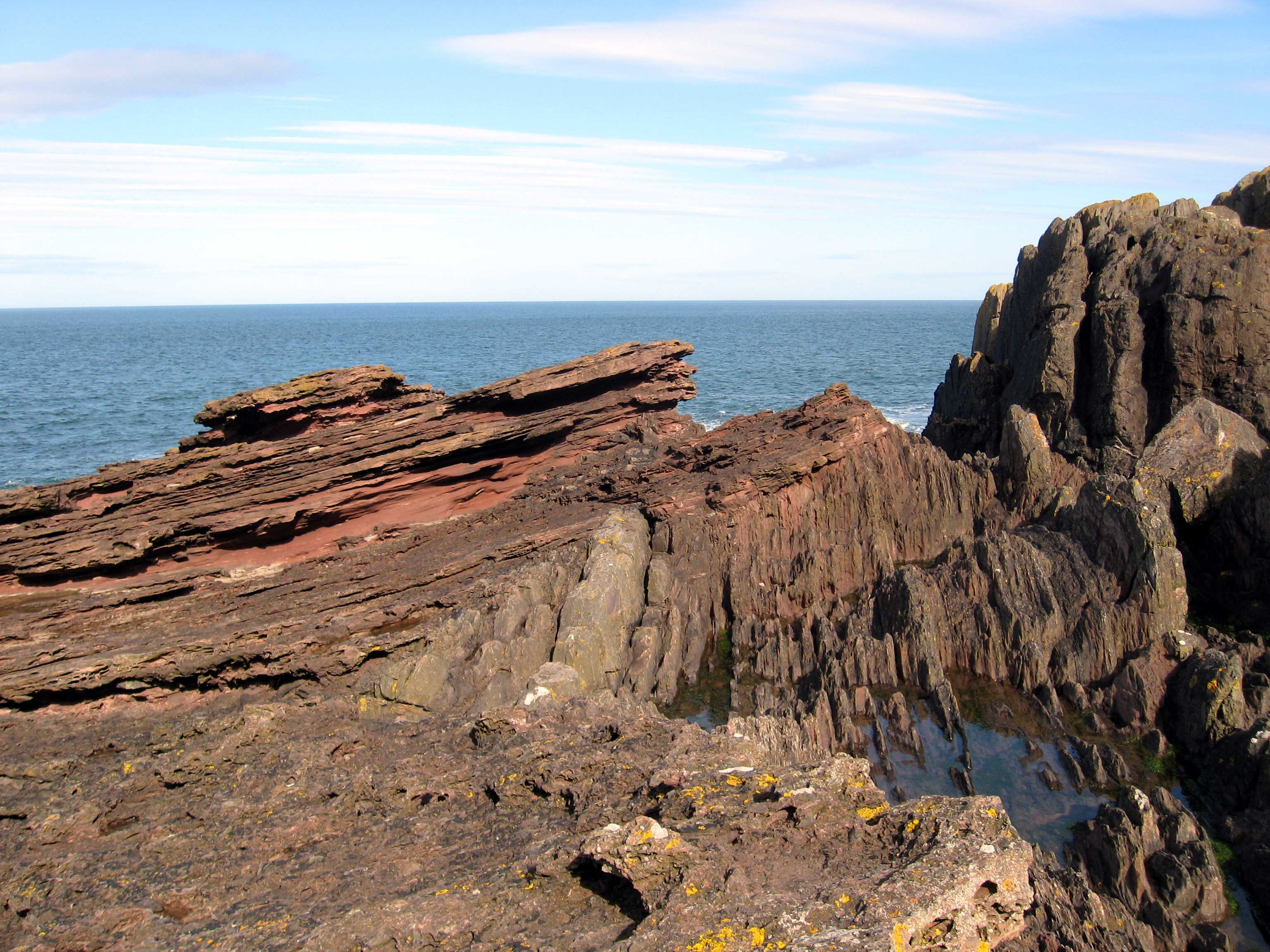
An eroded outcrop at Siccar Point showing sloping red sandstone above vertical greywacke was sketched by Sir James Hall in 1788. Location: 55.9315°N 2.3013°W

In the Spring of 1788 he set off with John Playfair to the Berwickshire coast and found more examples of this sequence in the valleys of the Tour and Pease Burns near Cockburnspath. They then took a boat trip from Dunglass Burn east along the coast with the geologist Sir James Hall of Dunglass. They found the sequence in the cliff below St. Helens, then just to the east at Siccar Point found what Hutton called "a beautiful picture of this junction washed bare by the sea". Playfair later commented about the experience, "the mind seemed to grow giddy by looking so far into the abyss of time". Continuing along the coast, they made more discoveries including sections of the vertical beds showing strong ripple marks which gave Hutton "great satisfaction" as a confirmation of his supposition that these beds had been laid horizontally in water. He also found conglomerate at altitudes that demonstrated the extent of erosion of the strata, and said of this that "we never should have dreamed of meeting with what we now perceived".

Hutton reasoned that there must have been innumerable cycles, each involving deposition on the seabed, uplift with tilting and erosion then undersea again for further layers to be deposited. On the belief that this was due to the same geological forces operating in the past as the very slow geological forces seen operating at the present day, the thicknesses of exposed rock layers implied to him enormous stretches of time.

== Publication ==
Though Hutton circulated privately a printed version of the abstract of his Theory (Concerning the System of the Earth, its Duration, and Stability) which he read at a meeting of the Royal Society of Edinburgh on 4 July 1785; the full account of his theory as read at 7 March 1785 and 4 April 1785 meetings did not appear in print until 1788. It was titled Theory of the Earth; or an Investigation of the Laws observable in the Composition, Dissolution, and Restoration of Land upon the Globe and appeared in Transactions of the Royal Society of Edinburgh, vol. I, Part II, pp. 209–304, plates I and II, published 1788. He put forward the view that "from what has actually been, we have data for concluding with regard to that which is to happen thereafter." This restated the Scottish Enlightenment concept which David Hume had put in 1777 as "all inferences from experience suppose ... that the future will resemble the past", and Charles Lyell memorably rephrased in the 1830s as "the present is the key to the past". Hutton's 1788 paper concludes; "The result, therefore, of our present enquiry is, that we find no vestige of a beginning,–no prospect of an end." His memorably phrased closing statement has long been celebrated as an aphorism to indicate the existence of geological deep time. However, exactly what Hutton meant by the phrase has been debated, as on p. 564 of Volume II Hutton writes: "It is in vain to seek for any computation of the time". A suggested alternative interpretation is that the concluding phrase refers to no vestige of the original rock that made the earth will ever be found, as in Hutton's cycle, rock is repeatedly destroyed and re-formed. (The aphorism was quoted in the 1989 song "No Control" by songwriter and professor Greg Graffin.)

Following criticism, especially the arguments from Richard Kirwan who thought Hutton's ideas were atheistic and not logical, Hutton published a two volume version of his theory in 1795, consisting of the 1788 version of his theory (with slight additions) along with a lot of material drawn from shorter papers Hutton already had to hand on various subjects such as the origin of granite. It included a review of alternative theories, such as those of Thomas Burnet and Georges-Louis Leclerc, Comte de Buffon.

== Opposing theories ==
His new theories placed him into opposition with the then-popular Neptunist theories of the German geologist Abraham Gottlob Werner, that all rocks had precipitated out of a single enormous flood. Hutton proposed that the interior of the Earth was hot, and that this heat was the engine which drove the creation of new rock: land was eroded by air and water and deposited as layers in the sea; heat then consolidated the sediment into stone, and uplifted it into new lands. This theory was dubbed "Plutonist" in contrast to the flood-oriented theory.

As well as combating the Neptunists, he also accepted the growing consensus on the concept of deep time for scientific purposes. Rather than accepting that the earth was no more than a few thousand years old, he maintained that the Earth must be much older, with a history extending indefinitely into the distant past. His main line of argument was that the tremendous displacements and changes he was seeing did not happen in a short period of time by means of catastrophe, but that processes still happening on the Earth in the present day had caused them. As these processes were very gradual, the Earth needed to be ancient, to allow time for the changes. Contemporary investigations had shown that the geologic record required vast time, but no good way of assigning actual years was found for over a century (Rudwick, Bursting the Limits of Time). Hutton's idea of infinite cycles with humans present throughout is quite different from modern geology, with a definite time of formation and directional change through time, but his supporting evidence for the long-term effects of geological processes was valuable in the development of historical geology.

== Acceptance of geological theories ==
Archibald Geikie claimed that the prose of Theory of the Earth was so obscure that it impeded the acceptance of Hutton's geological theories, This interpretation that Hutton's works were clumsily written has become the standard assumption, although, that narrative has been contested using techniques of close literary analysis of Hutton's projected third volume to suggest his writing reflects a contemporary style of travel writing and it is often lucid and powerful and potentially generates the informed wonder that was the hallmark of Romantic science Restatements of his geological ideas (though not his thoughts on evolution) by John Playfair in 1802 and then Charles Lyell in the 1830s popularised the concept of an infinitely repeating cycle, though Lyell tended to dismiss Hutton's views as giving too much credence to catastrophic changes.

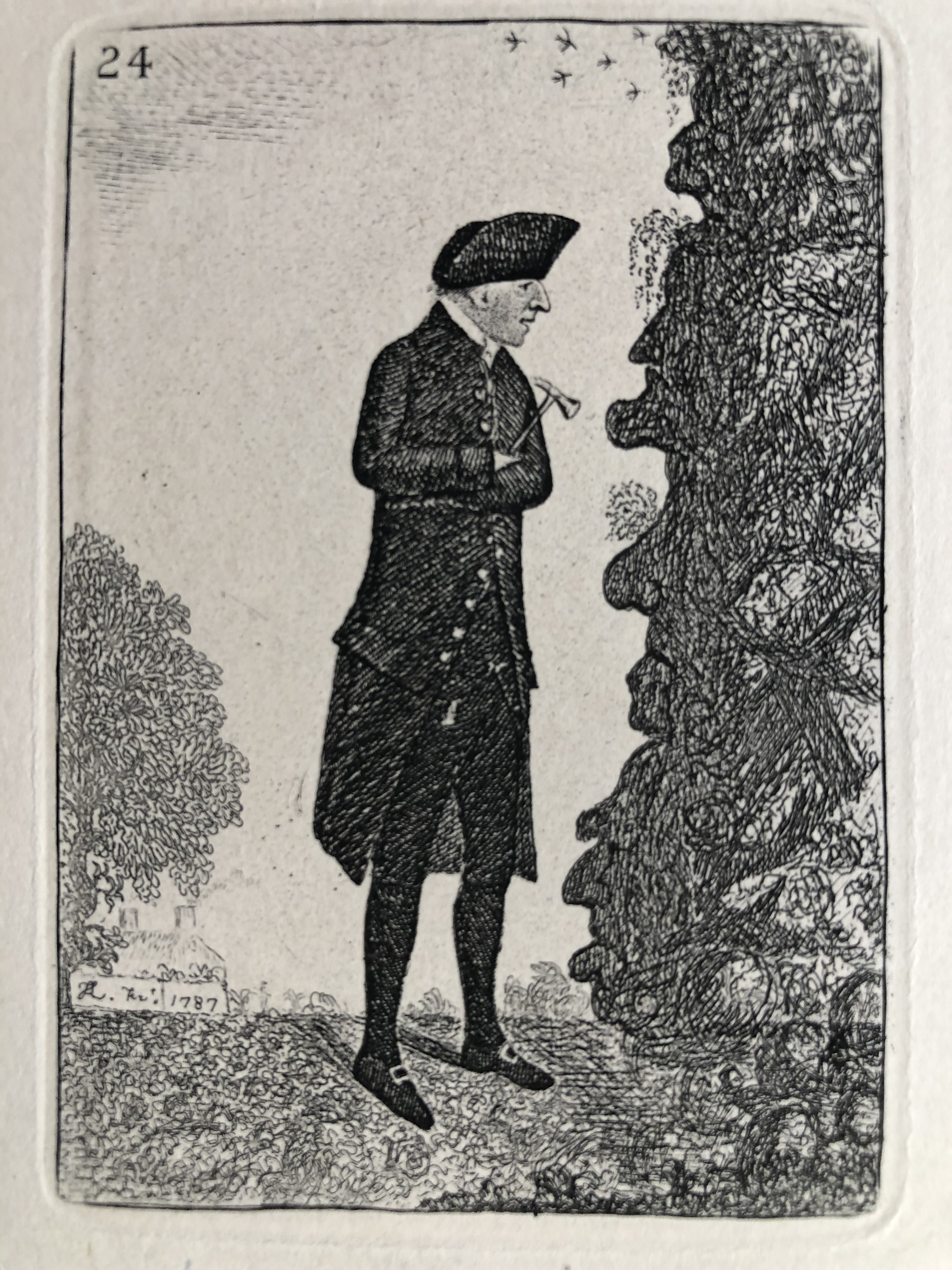
John Kay's caricature of James Hutton studying the "faces" of rock (1787)

== Other contributions ==
=== Hutton’s epistemological treatise ===
In 1794 Hutton published three volumes of a work entitled An Investigation of the Principles of Knowledge and of the Progress of Reason, from Sense to Science and Philosophy. In these volumes that Hutton explicitly lays out the epistemological principles that ostensibly motivated his revolutionary uniformitarian views in geology. The full 2,138 pages of the work prompted Playfair, in his biography of Hutton, to remark that "The great size of the book, and the obscurity which may justly be objected to many parts of it, have probably prevented it from being received as it deserves." pp.84–85

=== Meteorology ===
It was not merely the earth to which Hutton directed his attention. He had long studied the changes of the atmosphere. The same volume in which his Theory of the Earth appeared contained also a Theory of Rain. He contended that the amount of moisture which the air can retain in solution increases with temperature, and, therefore, that on the mixture of two masses of air of different temperatures a portion of the moisture must be condensed and appear in visible form. He investigated the available data regarding rainfall and climate in different regions of the globe, and came to the conclusion that the rainfall is regulated by the humidity of the air on the one hand, and mixing of different air currents in the higher atmosphere on the other.

=== Evolution ===
Hutton also advocated uniformitarianism for living creatures – evolution, in a sense – and even suggested natural selection as a possible mechanism affecting them:

...if an organised body is not in the situation and circumstances best adapted to its sustenance and propagation, then, in conceiving an indefinite variety among the individuals of that species, we must be assured, that, on the one hand, those which depart most from the best adapted constitution, will be the most liable to perish, while, on the other hand, those organised bodies, which most approach to the best constitution for the present circumstances, will be best adapted to continue, in preserving themselves and multiplying the individuals of their race. – Investigation of the Principles of Knowledge, volume 2.

Hutton gave the example that where dogs survived through "swiftness of foot and quickness of sight... the most defective in respect of those necessary qualities, would be the most subject to perish, and that those who employed them in greatest perfection... would be those who would remain, to preserve themselves, and to continue the race". Equally, if an acute sense of smell became "more necessary to the sustenance of the animal... the same principle [would] change the qualities of the animal, and.. produce a race of well scented hounds, instead of those who catch their prey by swiftness". The same "principle of variation" would influence "every species of plant, whether growing in a forest or a meadow". He came to his ideas as the result of experiments in plant and animal breeding, some of which he outlined in an unpublished manuscript, the Elements of Agriculture. He distinguished between heritable variation as the result of breeding, and non-heritable variations caused by environmental differences such as soil and climate.

Though he saw his "principle of variation" as explaining the development of varieties, Hutton rejected the idea that evolution might originate species as a "romantic fantasy", according to palaeoclimatologist Paul Pearson. Influenced by deism, Hutton thought the mechanism allowed species to form varieties better adapted to particular conditions and provided evidence of benevolent design in nature. Studies of Charles Darwin's notebooks have shown that Darwin arrived separately at the idea of natural selection which he set out in his 1859 book On the Origin of Species, but it has been speculated that he had some half-forgotten memory from his time as a student in Edinburgh of ideas of selection in nature as set out by Hutton, and by William Charles Wells and Patrick Matthew who had both been associated with the city before publishing their ideas on the topic early in the 19th century.

== Works ==
- 1785. Abstract of a dissertation read in the Royal Society of Edinburgh, upon the seventh of March, and fourth of April, MDCCLXXXV, Concerning the System of the Earth, Its Duration, and Stability. Edinburgh. 30pp. at Oxford Digital Library.
- 1788.The theory of rain. Transactions of the Royal Society of Edinburgh, vol. 1, Part 2, pp. 41–86.
- 1788. Theory of the Earth; or an investigation of the laws observable in the composition, dissolution, and restoration of land upon the Globe. Transactions of the Royal Society of Edinburgh, vol. 1, Part 2, pp. 209–304. at Internet Archive.
- 1792. Dissertations on different subjects in natural philosophy. Edinburgh & London: Strahan & Cadell. at Google Books
- 1794. Observations on granite. Transactions of the Royal Society of Edinburgh, vol. 3, pp. 77–81.
- 1794. A dissertation upon the philosophy of light, heat, and fire. Edinburgh: Cadell, Junior, Davies. at e-rara (ETH-Bibliothek)
- 1794. An investigation of the principles of knowledge and of the progress of reason, from sense to science and philosophy. Edinburgh: Strahan & Cadell. at (VIRGO) University of Virginia Library
- 1795. Theory of the Earth; with proofs and illustrations. Edinburgh: Creech. 3 vols. at e-rara (ETH-Bibliothek)
- 1797. Elements of Agriculture. Unpublished manuscript.
- 1899. Theory of the Earth; with proofs and illustrations, vol III, Edited by Sir Archibald Geikie. Geological Society, Burlington House, London. at Internet Archive

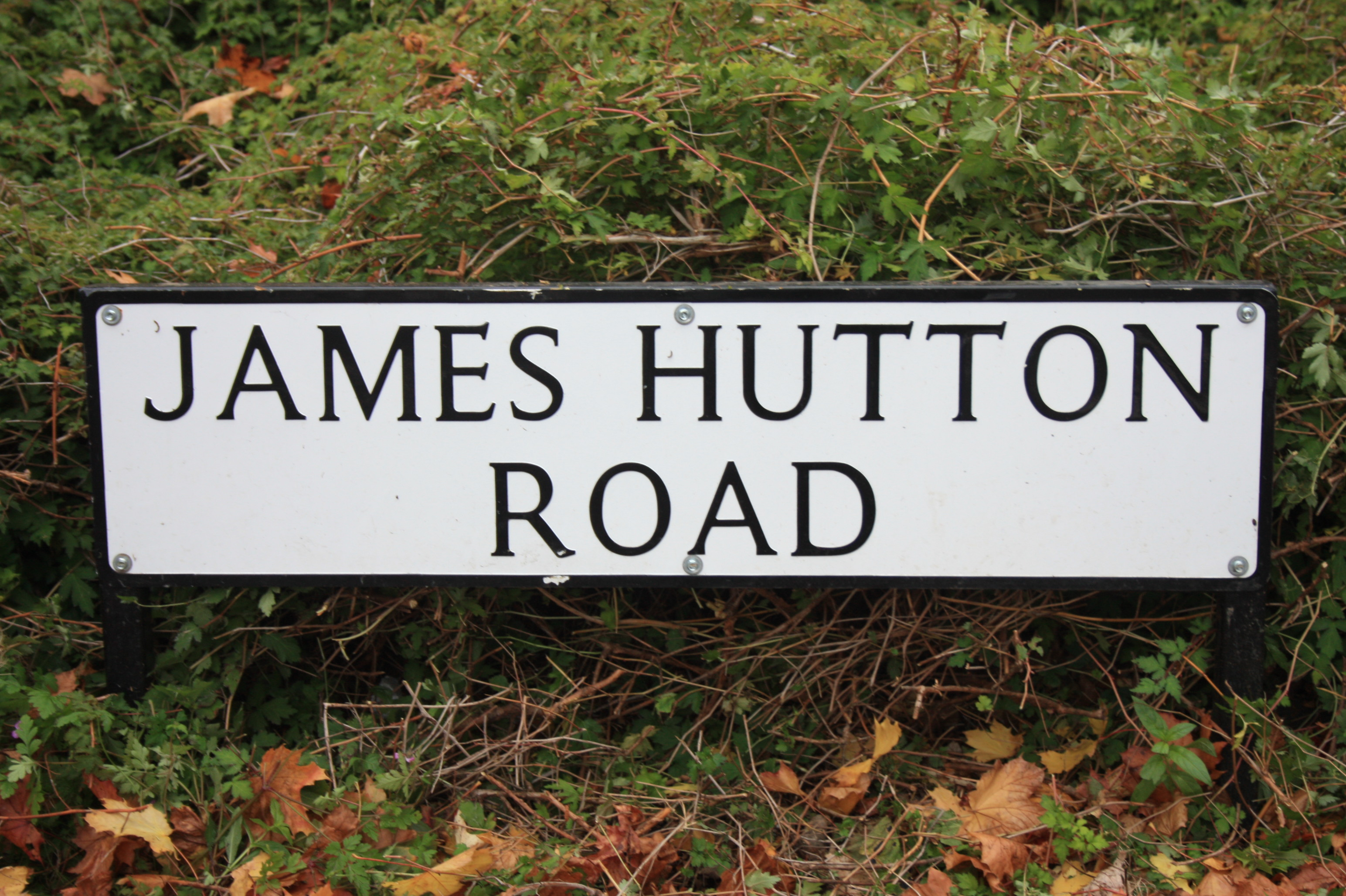
Street sign in the Kings Buildings complex in Edinburgh to the memory of James Hutton

== Recognition ==
- A street was named after Hutton in the Kings Buildings complex (a series of science buildings linked to Edinburgh University) in the early 21st century.
- The punk band Bad Religion quoted James Hutton with "no vestige of a beginning, no prospect of an end" in their song "No Control".
- The James Hutton Institute, a globally recognised research organisation based in Invergowrie, Scotland, is named after him.

== See also ==
- Deep history
- James Hutton Institute
- Climate of Scotland
- Geology of Scotland
- Shen Kuo
- Time's Arrow, Time's Cycle, a book by Stephen Jay Gould that reassesses Hutton's work
