= John Clerk of Eldin =

Scottish merchant, naval author, artist, geologist and landowner

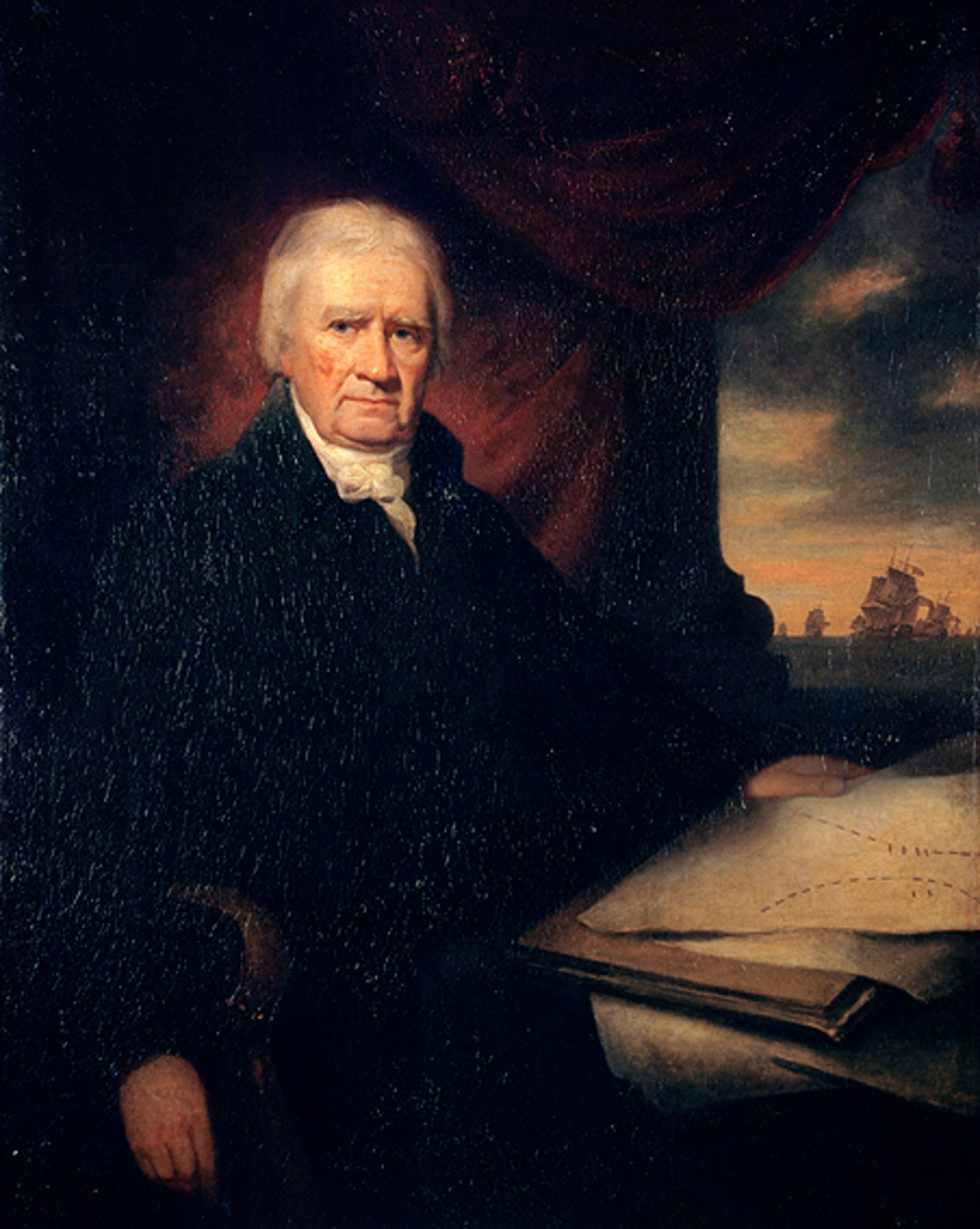
Portrait of Clerk of Eldin by James Saxon, painted in 1805.

John Clerk of Eldin FRSE FSAScot (10 December 1728 – 10 May 1812) was a Scottish merchant, author, artist, geologist and landowner. The 7th son of Sir John Clerk of Penicuik, Bt, Clerk of Eldin was a figure in the Scottish Enlightenment, best remembered for his influential writings on naval tactics in the Age of Sail. A friend of geologist James Hutton, he was a brother-in-law of architect Robert Adam, and a great-great-uncle of physicist James Clerk Maxwell.

== Biography ==
John's father, John Clerk, 2nd Baronet of Penicuik was a judge and political figure of some importance who took part in the negotiations leading up to the Acts of Union 1707. Young John attended Dalkeith Grammar School where he was reputed to have been a keen scholar, and was enrolled at the University of Edinburgh to study medicine, (his father had marked him to becoming a "top chyrugeon") but abandoned his studies and entered into business. Clerk made his fortune as a merchant (he is understood to have been a clothier) and manager of a coal mine, and in 1763 he was able to buy himself the property of Eldin, in Lasswade, near Edinburgh. There, he devoted himself to science and art. In 1753, having been a constant visitor of the Adam family, and being a close friend to the renowned architect Robert Adam, he married Susannah Adam, Robert's younger sister by whom he had seven children, all who died unmarried.

In 1783 he was a founder member of the Royal Society of Edinburgh.

By 1793, Clerk had retired, but still moved between Eldin and Edinburgh, having bought a house on Princes Street in 1788, overlooking the castle. A typical Enlightenment figure, he was a man of many interests, including geology, architecture, and art. He conducted several geological surveys with his friend James Hutton in the 1780s as background preparation to providing the illustrations for Hutton's renowned book Theory of the Earth, and accompanied Robert Adam on sketching tours. Visitors to his home were entertained by his pet jackdaw. He died peacefully at Eldin on 10 May 1812, surrounded by his family.

== Work in Naval Tactics ==
From an early age, Clerk had been interested in shipping, and had cultivated contacts among owners, sailors, and others involved in seafaring. He made the acquaintance of engineer and sometime naval architect Patrick Miller of Dalswinton, who encouraged Clerk's interest in nautical matters.

In about 1770, a former Royal Navy officer, Commissioner Edgar, took up retirement in the village of Eldin where Clerk lived. Inevitably he met Clerk, and shared stories of his experiences at sea. He had served under Admiral John Byng, and was a friend of Admiral Edward Boscawen. Edgar appears to have taken a keen interest in naval tactics, and was the key source for Clerk of Eldin's writings. As well as relying on Edgar's personal experience and knowledge, Clerk began to research naval tactics through the memoirs of former officers and campaigns, such as the Mediterranean operations during the War of the Austrian Succession by Admiral Thomas Mathews in 1744, and also more recent events, such as the Battle of Ushant, which led to a court case between Admirals Augustus Keppel and Hugh Palliser.

The unexpected British defeat at the Battle of the Chesapeake may have been the event that led to Clerk moving on from studying tactics, to theorising and writing about them. In doing so, he broke new ground in English naval tactics. While technical manuals, notably signalling books and the various Fighting Instructions, had been published before, no study of naval tactics had been written in English. The earlier 1762 work of Christopher O'Bryen, which is sometimes advanced as such, was merely an abridgement and translation of the late 17th century works of the French writer Father Paul Hoste, and of the same genre as the Fighting Instructions.

In his Essay on Naval Tactics (1779, published 1790), Clerk expounded on the tactic known as "cutting the line". This involved sailing into the enemy's line of ships, and attacking the rear ships of the enemy's line with the whole force of the attacking fleet. Horatio Nelson used several sentences from Clerk's work in his orders to the British fleet before the Battle of Trafalgar.

== Etchings ==
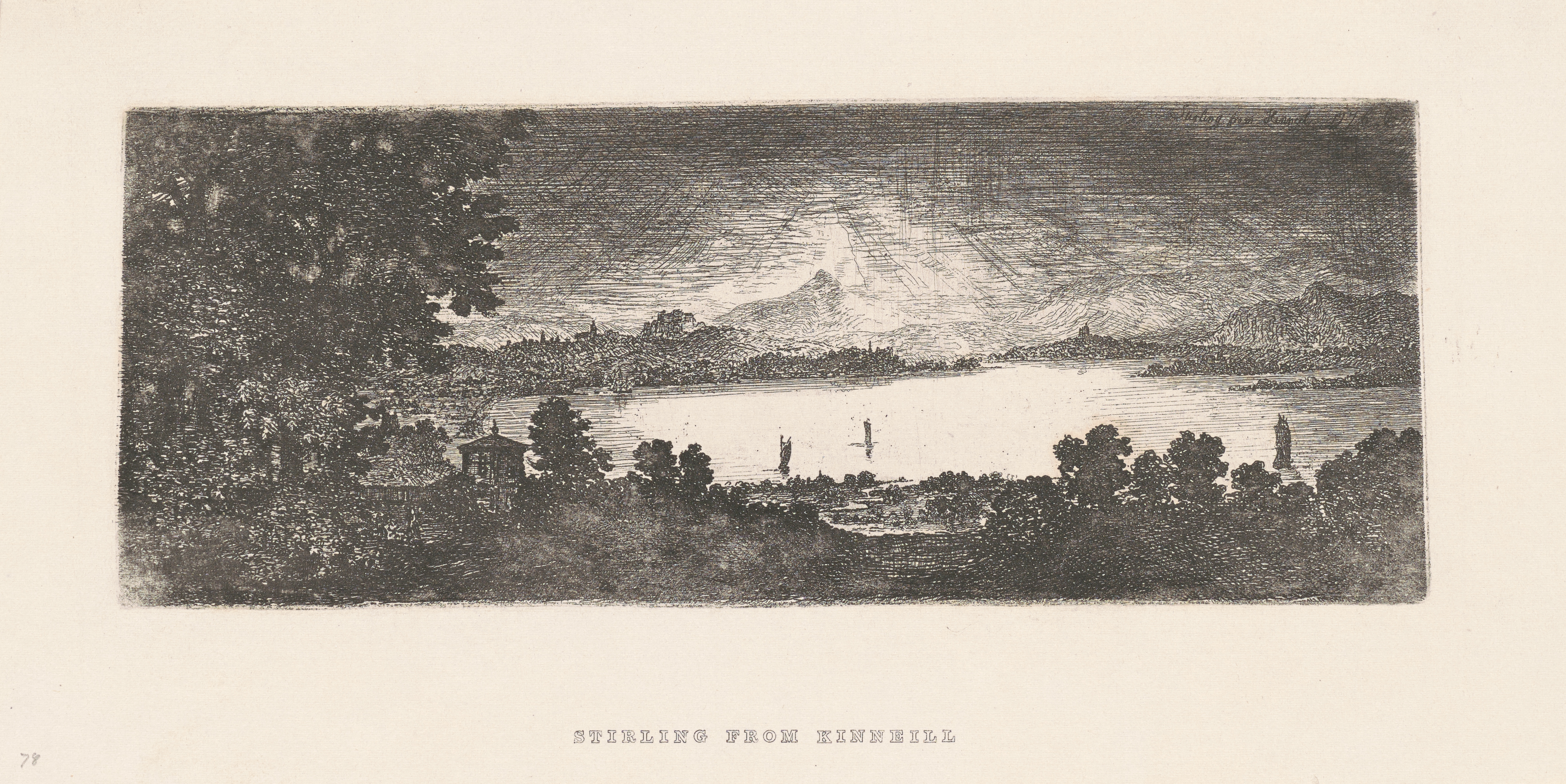
Stirling from Kinnell, etching, 1776

John Clerk of Eldin learned to draw from an early age. It was in his father, Sir John Clerk of Penicuik's opinion that "I recommend to all young lads of this family to lairn to draw or design as the best means of advancing their fortunes, for they can neither be good sojars nor first seamen if they know not how to design a Country, a Town, a House, and especially a fortified Town or Castle." Clerk and his friend Robert Adam were wont to go out drawing together, and were joined in the late 1740s, by the younger Paul Sandby, the later, well-known English draughtsman, who was in Scotland under the Board of Ordnance Survey from 1746 to 1751. The earliest known drawings belong to around 1750. Given the friendship between the three men it is no surprise to find a similarity in their drawing style at that time. Clerk was fundamentally a topographical artist, his landscapes often than not being centred on a particular historical building.

Although Clerk would have known Sandby's own etchings, Clerk himself does not mention any teachers and so we must consider him as self-taught. Nonetheless Clerk would have been acquainted with engravers in Edinburgh if he sought advice. One name is Andrew Bell (1726-1810) who had been an apprentice engraver with Richard Cooper the Elder (1701-1764) between 1741 and 1748. Cooper's workshop had a high reputation and would have been a clear choice for anyone wishing to learn printmaking. Cooper received work from both Sir John Clerk of Penicuik and William Adam, placing him centrally within the Clerk/Adam circle.

Clerk's early career was seemingly haphazard, a trial and error education. Overall, Clerk of Eldin went on to produce over one hundred and ten etchings, from the first impressions from around 1770, to the last in 1778. It is difficult to say exactly when he started etching; he states himself to have commenced at age forty five, that is in 1773, but as dated works of 1772 survive, this is unlikely. The standard even in 1772 is too high for a complete beginner. Clerk made sets of etchings which he sold, at a time well before any concept of formal editions. He printed up to order though he was to pass this burden to Thomas Philipe "Printseller at his shop, second door of the Bull turnpike, opposite the Tron Church, Edinburgh" who also made up the sets. His images, handled in a style that owed much to European master printers, capture the castles and ruins of Scotland in a fine picturesque manner. They are quite charming and of a surprisingly high quality for an amateur printmaker.

On his death, the collection of prints and plates were retained by his family, and in 1825, with the help of his son John Clerk, Lord Eldin, the Bannatyne Club of Edinburgh issued a volume of etching called 'Etchings, Chiefly Views of Scotland by John Clerk of Eldin'. This publication contained twenty-six views. In 1855, the Bannatyne Club published another issue, this time with seventy-six etchings, as additional plates had been discovered at Eldin. It is understood that The Bannatyne Club then destroyed the plates, their quality having seriously deteriorated.

== Legacy ==
In Guy Mannering, Sir Walter Scott described Clerk of Eldin in the following manner:

You who are a worshipper of originality should come a pilgrimage to Edinburgh to see this remarkable man. The table at which he sits is covered with a miscellaneous collection of all sorts — paints and crayons, clay models, books, letters, instruments, specimens of mineralogy of all sorts, vials and chemical liquors for experiments, plans of battles ancient and modern, models of new mechanical engines, maps, sheets of music – in short an emblematical chaos of literature and science.
