= Theory of the Earth =

Book by James Hutton

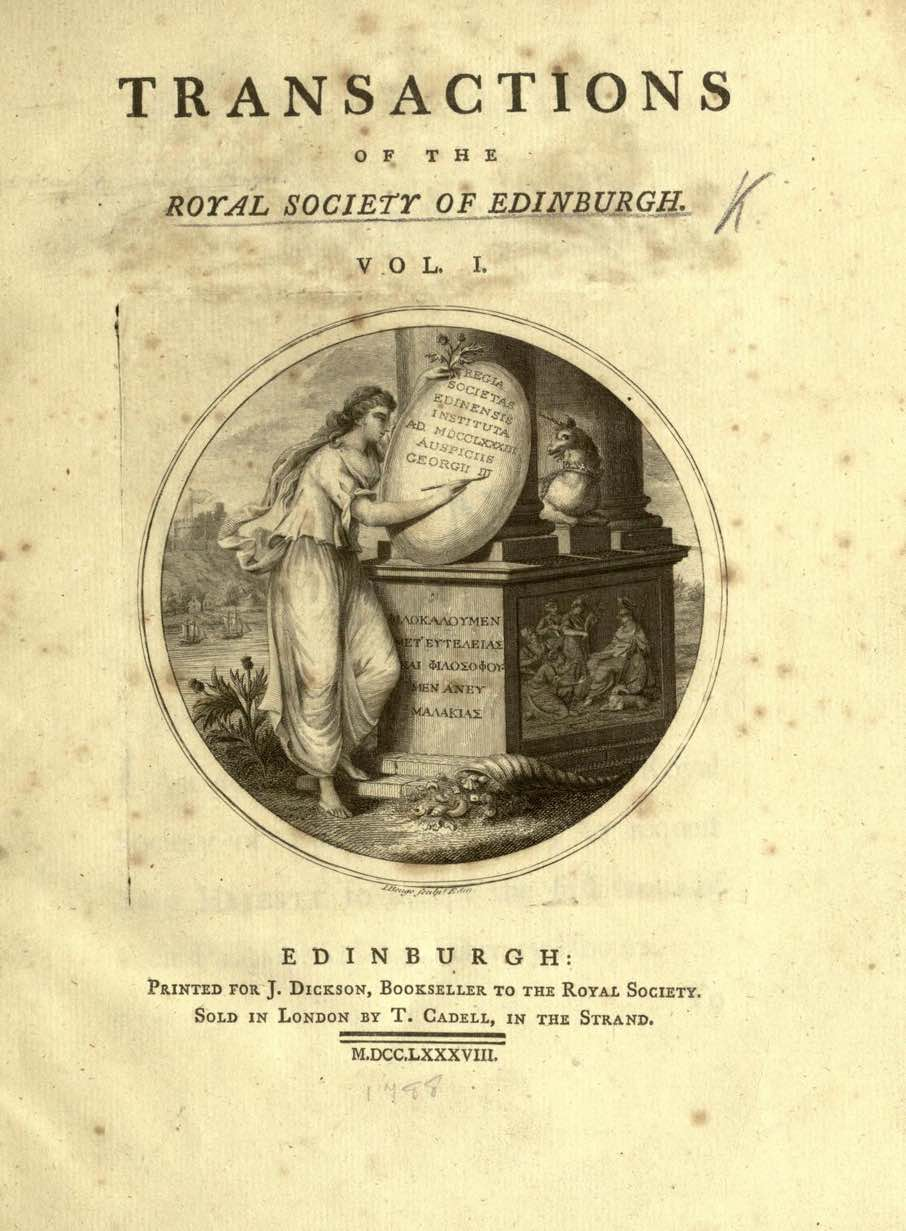
- The issue of the cover of Transactions of the Royal Society of Edinburgh that the "Theory of the Earth" was first published
- Author: James Hutton
- Language: English
- Series: Transactions of the Royal Society of Edinburgh, Vol. 1
- Publisher: Royal Society of Edinburgh
- Publication date: 1788
- Publication place: Scotland

Theory of the Earth is a publication by James Hutton which laid the foundations for geology. In it he showed that the Earth is the product of natural forces. What could be seen happening today, over long periods of time, could produce what we see in the rocks. It also hypothesized that the age of the Earth was much older than what biblical literalists claim. This idea, uniformitarianism, was used by Charles Lyell in his work, and Lyell's textbook was an important influence on Charles Darwin. The work was first published in 1788 by the Royal Society of Edinburgh, and later in 1795 as two book volumes.

Hutton recognized that rocks record the evidence of the past action of processes which still operate today. He also anticipated natural selection, as follows: "Those which depart most from the best adapted constitution, will be the most liable to perish, while, on the other hand, those organised bodies, which most approach to the best constitution for the present circumstances, will be best adapted to continue, in preserving themselves and multiplying the individuals of their race".

== History ==
Hutton's prose hindered his theories. They were not taken seriously until 1802, when Edinburgh University mathematics professor John Playfair restated Hutton's geological ideas in clearer, much simpler English. However, he left out Hutton's thoughts on evolution. Charles Lyell in the 1830s popularised the idea of an infinitely repeating cycle (of the erosion of rocks and the building up of sediment). Lyell believed in gradual change, and thought even Hutton gave too much credit to catastrophic changes.

Hutton's work was published in different forms and stages:

1. 1788. Theory of the Earth; or an investigation of the laws observable in the composition, dissolution, and restoration of land upon the Globe. Transactions of the Royal Society of Edinburgh, vol. 1, Part 2, pp. 209–304.
2. 1795. Theory of the Earth; with proofs and illustrations. 2 vols, Edinburgh: Creech.
3. 1899. Theory of the Earth; with proofs and illustrations, vol III. Edited by Sir Archibald Geikie. Geological Society, Burlington House, London.
