= Jameson (name) =

Jameson is a patronymic surname meaning "son of James". It may also be a given name. Notable people with the name include:

== Surname ==
=== A ===
- Adam Jameson (1860–1907), Scottish physician
- Andrew Jameson (disambiguation), multiple people
- Andy Jameson (born 1965), English sports commentator
- Anna Brownell Jameson (1794–1860), Anglo-Irish artist
- Antony Jameson (born 1934), British aeronautical engineer
- Arron Jameson (born 1989), English footballer

=== B ===
- Bert Jameson, English priest
- Betty Jameson (1919–2009), American golfer
- Bobby Jameson (1945–2015), American singer and songwriter

=== C ===
- Charles Davis Jameson (1827–1862), American soldier and politician
- Clarence Jameson (1872–1928), Canadian politician
- Claude Jameson (1886–1943), American soccer player
- Claudia Jameson, American writer

=== D ===
- David Jameson (disambiguation), multiple people
- Derek Jameson (1929–2012), British journalist and broadcaster
- Dorothea Jameson (1920–1998), American psychologist
- Drey Jameson (born 1997), American baseball player

=== F ===
- Freddie Jameson (born 1929), English trumpeter
- Fredric Jameson (1934–2024), American social theorist

=== G ===
- Geoffrey Jameson (1928–2017), Australian wrestler
- Geoff Jameson, New Zealand biochemist
- George Jameson (RNZAF officer) (1921–1998), New Zealand flying ace of the Second World War
- Graeme Jameson (born 1936), Australian engineer

=== H ===
- Harold Jameson (1918–1940), Irish cricketer
- Helen Jameson (born 1963), English swimmer
- Henry Jameson (1883–1938), American soccer player
- Henry Lyster Jameson (1874–1922), Irish zoologist
- House Jameson (1902–1971), American actor

=== J ===
- Jackie Jameson (1957–2002), Irish footballer
- James Jameson (disambiguation), multiple people
- Jenna Jameson (born 1974), American entrepreneur
- Jerry Jameson (born 1934), American film director
- J. Franklin Jameson (1859–1937), American historian
- J. J. Jameson, American convicted murderer, poet
- Joan Jameson (1892–1953), Irish artist
- John Jameson (disambiguation), multiple people
- Johnny Jameson (born 1958), Northern Irish footballer
- Jools Jameson (born 1968), British game designer and entrepreneur
- Joyce Jameson (1927–1987), American actress

=== K ===
- Kate Wetzel Jameson (1870–1967), American professor
- Kyle Jameson (born 1998), English footballer
- Kylie Jameson (born 1976), New Zealand sailor

=== L ===
- Larry Jameson (born 1953), American football player
- Leander Starr Jameson (1853–1917), British politician
- Louise Jameson (born 1951), English actress

=== M ===
- Malcolm Jameson (1891–1945), American writer
- Marc Jameson, American software developer
- Melville Jameson (born 1944), British army officer
- Michael Jameson (born 1979), American football player
- Michael H. Jameson (1924–2004), American professor
- Middleton Jameson (1851–1919), Scottish artist

=== N ===
- Natalie Jameson, Canadian politician
- Nathan Jameson (born 1985), English footballer
- Nick Jameson (born 1950), American voice actor
- Nicole LaPointe Jameson (born 1994), American businesswoman

=== P ===
- Patrick Jameson (1912–1996), New Zealand Air Force officer
- Paula Jameson, New Zealand physiologist
- Pauline Jameson (1920–2007), English actress
- Percy Jameson (1917–1981), English footballer
- Peter Jameson (born 1993), English footballer
- Philip Jameson (born 1941), American musician

=== R ===
- Rex Jameson (1924–1983), English comedian
- Richard Jameson (disambiguation), multiple people
- Robert Jameson (disambiguation), multiple people
- Rod Jameson (born 1970), Australian rules footballer

=== S ===
- Sally Y. Jameson, American politician
- Shirley Jameson (1918–1993), American baseball player
- Stephanie Jameson (born 1982), Canadian field hockey player
- Stephen Jameson (disambiguation), multiple people
- Storm Jameson (1891–1986), English journalist and author
- Susan Jameson (born 1941), English actress

=== T ===
- Tameka Jameson (born 1989), Nigerian sprinter
- Tami Jameson (born 1968), American handball player
- Thomas Jameson (disambiguation), multiple people
- Tom Jameson (1892–1965), Irish cricketer
- Toni Jameson (born 1968), American handball player

=== W ===
- W. C. Jameson (born 1942), American singer-songwriter
- William Jameson (disambiguation), multiple people
- Wilson Jameson (1885–1962), Scottish doctor

== Given name ==
- Jameson Adams (1880–1962), British explorer
- Jameson Blake (born 1997), Filipino-American actor
- Jameson Bostic (born 1984), American boxer
- Jameson Chikowero (born 1996), Zimbabwean cricketer
- Jameson Clark (1907–1984), Scottish actor
- Jameson Clark (singer) (born 1972), American singer
- JamesOn Curry (born 1986), American basketball player
- Jameson Mbilini Dlamini (1932–2008), Swazi politician
- Jameson Fisher (born 1995), American baseball player
- Jameson Houston (born 1996), American football player
- Jameson Hsu, Taiwanese-American media executive
- Jameson Konz (born 1986), American football player
- Jameson Lopp, American engineer
- Jameson Marvin (born 1941), American conductor
- Jameson Mukombwe (born 1991), Zimbabwean footballer
- Jameson Parker (born 1947), American actor
- Jameson Rodgers (born 1987), American musician
- Jameson Strachan (born 1988), Bahamian athlete
- Jameson Taillon (born 1991), Canadian-American baseball player
- Jameson Thomas (1888–1939), English actor
- Jameson Timba, Zimbabwean politician
- Jameson Wang (born 2001), American football player
- Jameson Williams (born 2001), American football player

== Fictional people ==
- Jameson Winchester Hawthorne, character in the book series The Inheritance Games, main character, Avery Kylie Grambs love interest along with his brother Grayson Hawthorne.
- J. Jonah Jameson, character in the Marvel Comics universe, father of John Jameson
- John Jameson, character in the Marvel Comics universe, son of J. Jonah Jameson
- Keoni Jameson, Lilo Pelekai's love interest only in Lilo & Stitch: The Series

== See also ==
- Jakobsen
- Jamison (surname)
- Jamieson (disambiguation)
- James (given name), James (surname)
- Díaz (surname)
