= Jamison (surname) =

Jamison is an English, Scottish or northern Irish name, literally meaning "son of James", and found as both a male given name and a surname. As the latter, it may refer to:

- Aaron Flint Jamison (born 1979), American conceptual artist and associate professor
- Abbie Norton Jamison (1869–1955), American pianist, composer and clubwoman
- Alcinous Burton Jamison (1851–1938), American physician, inventor, socialite, and occultist
- Al Jamison (1937–2021), American football player
- Alpha Jamison (1875–1962), American football player and coach
- Anne Jamison (professor of English), American professor of English
- Anne Jamison (singer) (1910-1961), American singer
- Antawn Jamison (born 1976), American basketball player
- Bud Jamison (1894–1944), American film actor
- Brandon Jamison (born 1981), American football linebacker
- Bryce Jamison (born 2006), American soccer player
- Cathy Jamison (born 1950), American swimmer
- Cecilia Viets Jamison (1837–1909), Canadian-born American writer
- Chris Jamison (born 1994), American singer-songwriter
- Christopher Jamison (born 1951), Benedectine monk
- Clarence B. Jamison (1857–?), American football, basketball, and track and field coach
- Clarence C. Jamison (1918–2014), American combat fighter pilot
- David Jamison (disambiguation), multiple people
- Dean Jamison (born c. 1943), American economist
- Doug Jamison (born 1952), Canadian swimmer
- D'Shawn Jamison (born 1999), American football player
- Ernie Jamison (1924–2003), Canadian publisher and politician
- Evelyn Jamison (1877–1972), British medievalist
- George Jamison (born 1962), American football player
- Greg Jamison, American politician
- Harold Jamison (born 1976), American basketball player
- Herbert Jamison (1875–1938), American athlete
- James L. Jamison (died 1873), American farmer, teacher, businessman and state legislator
- Jawan Jamison (born 1991), American football player
- Jimi Jamison (1951–2014), American singer-songwriter
- John Jamison (1776–1844), Ulster-Scots Knight, doctor of medicine, and pioneer Australian land owner
- Johnny Jamison (born 1948), Northern Irish footballer
- Joniece Jamison (born 1956), American singer and backing vocalist
- Josiah Jamison (born 1982), American sprint runner
- Judith Jamison (born 1943), American dancer and choreographer
- Kay Redfield Jamison (born 1946), American psychologist and psychiatry professor
- Leslie Jamison (born 1983), American novelist and essayist
- Linda and Terry Jamison (born 1955), American "psychic twins"
- Mae Jemison (born 1956), American astronaut
- Matthew Jamison (disambiguation), multiple people
- Mercedes Jamison (1933–1997), American artist
- Michael Jamison (born 1986), Australian rules footballer
- Norm Jamison (1950–2017), Canadian politician
- Philip Jamison (1925–2021), American artist
- Robert Jamison (1829–1878), Australian pastoralist and politician
- Roosevelt Jamison (1936–2013), American music manager, publicist and songwriter
- Ross Jamison (born 1990), British-Hong Kong racing driver
- Sam Jamison (1905–1997), Australian rules footballer
- Sean Jamison (born 1990), South African cricketer
- Shawn Jamison (born 1969), American basketball coach and player
- Shelly Jamison (born 1962), American television news reporter and public official
- Stephanie W. Jamison (born 1948), American linguist
- Taini Jamison (1928–2023), New Zealand netball coach and administrator
- Terrance Jamison, American football coach and former player
- Thomas Jamison (c. 1753–1811), Ulster-Scots naval surgeon, First Fleet settler and a Surgeon-General of New South Wales, Australia
- Tim Jamison (born 1986), American football player
- Timothy F. Jamison, American professor of chemistry
- Vontrell Jamison (born 1982), American football player

== See also ==
- Jameson (name)
- Jamieson (disambiguation)
- Jemison (surname)
