= Jamison =

Jamison may refer to:

== People with the surname ==
- Jamison (surname)

== Places ==
- Jamison, California
- Jamison, Nebraska, US
- Jamison City, Pennsylvania, US
- Jamison, Pennsylvania, US
- Jamison Valley, New South Wales, Australia

== Other ==
- Jamison, a WWE personality and manager of The Bushwhackers portrayed by John DiGiacomo in the late 1980s/early 1990s
- Jamison family deaths, the disappearance and death of Bobby, Sherilynn, and Madyson Jamison

== See also ==
- Jamison Centre, a shopping centre in the Australian Capital Territory
- Little Jamison, California
- Jameson
- Jamieson (disambiguation)
- Jemison (disambiguation)
