= Jameson =

Jameson may refer to:

- Jameson (name)

== Places ==
In the United States

- Jameson, Missouri
- Jameson, Washington

Elsewhere

- Jameson Islands, Nunavut, Canada
- Jameson Land, Greenland
- Jameson Point, South Shetland Islands, Antarctica

== Other ==
- Jameson Irish Whiskey, a brand of whiskey
- Jameson Raid, a failed raid against the South African Republic
- Jameson Raid (band), British heavy metal band

== See also ==
- Jamison (disambiguation)
- Jamieson (disambiguation)
