= Brian Jamieson =

Brian Jamieson may refer to:

- Brian Jamieson (rower), American rower
- Brian Jamieson (director), director from New Zealand

== See also ==
- Jamieson (surname)
