= Jamieson =

Jamieson is a name of English origin.

Jamieson may refer to:

== Surname ==
- Alice Jamieson, Canadian feminist and magistrate
- Alix Jamieson (born 1942), Scottish long jumper (1964, Olympic Games)
- Andrew Jamieson (1849–1912), Scottish engineer and academic author
- Archibald Jamieson (1884 – 1959), Scottish businessman
- Billy Jamieson, antique and curios dealer from Toronto
- Bob Jamieson, American television journalist
- Cathy Jamieson, member of the Scottish parliament
- Charlie Jamieson, American baseball player
- Colin Jamieson, Western Australian politician
- Craig Jamieson (Robert Craig Jamieson, born 1953), Cambridge academic
- David Auldjo Jamieson, Victoria Cross recipient
- David Jamieson (British politician), British politician
- David Jamieson (Canadian politician)
- Don Jamieson (politician), Canadian politician
- Don Jamieson (comedian)
- Douglas Jamieson, magistrate, Scottish unionist
- George W. Jamieson (1810–1868), American actor
- Hamish Jamieson (1932–2023), Australian Anglican bishop
- Henry Jamieson, English footballer
- Hugh Pierce Jamieson, American politician
- Iain Jamieson, Scottish footballer and businessman
- Ian R. Jamieson, a pseudonym of Ron Goulart, writer
- James Jamieson (disambiguation), several people
- Jane Jamieson, Australian athlete
- Janet Jamieson, All-American Girls Professional Baseball League player
- Jim Jamieson (1943–2018), U.S. golfer
- John Jamieson, Scottish lexicographer
- John Kenneth Jamieson, Canadian-American engineer and oilman
- Kathleen Hall Jamieson, American professor of Communications and fact checker
- Kenneth Jamieson, American politician
- Kyle Jamieson, New Zealand cricketer
- Leah Jamieson, American electronics engineer and academic
- Liz Jamieson-Hastings (1944–2022), New Zealand addiction educator
- Margaret Jamieson, Scottish Labour politician
- Mathew Buchan Jamieson (1860–1895), Scottish civil engineer in British Guiana and Australia
- Michael Jamieson, (born 1988), Scottish swimmer
- Nina Moore Jamieson (1885–1932), Irish born Canadian teacher, journalist, poet and lecturer.
- Norma Jamieson, Tasmanian politician
- Penny Jamieson, Anglican bishop of Dunedin, New Zealand
- Peter Michael Jamieson, Scottish chess master
- Phil Jamieson, Australian rock musician with Grinspoon
- Reid Jamieson, Canadian singer songwriter
- Reuben Rupert Jamieson, mayor of Calgary, Alberta
- Robert Jamieson (disambiguation), several people
- Scott Jamieson, Australian footballer (soccer)
- Scott Jamieson (golfer), Scottish golfer
- Stuart Jamieson, New Brunswick, Canada politician
- Thomas Jamieson (1829–1913), Scottish geologist
- Thomas Hill Jamieson (1843–1876), Scottish librarian
- Tim Jamieson, American baseball coach
- William Allan Jamieson, (1839–1916) Scottish physician and academic author
- William Darius Jamieson, (1873–1949) newspaper publisher and Congressman from Iowa
- William Jamieson (Australian politician), (1861–1912) member of South Australian House of Assembly
- William Jamieson (mining) (1853–1926), Australian surveyor, co-founder of Broken Hill Proprietary mines
- Willie Jamieson (born 1963), Scottish footballer
- Willie Jamieson (curler), Scottish curler
- Yazmeen Jamieson (born 1998), Canadian-born footballer with Jamaica women's team

== Given name ==
- Jamieson Greer, American trade official
- Jamieson Leeson (born 2003), Australian boccia player
- Jamieson Price, American actor
- Jamieson Sheahan (born 1997), Canadian football player

== Places ==
- Jamieson, Oregon, an unincorporated community in Malheur County
- Jamieson, Victoria, a town in Australia
- Jamieson Place, Edmonton, neighborhood in Canada

== Other uses ==
- Jamieson v HM Advocate, a Scottish legal case of 1994 relating to consent in rape cases
- Dr. Annie B. Jamieson Elementary School

== See also ==
- Jaimeson, British electronic music producer
- Jamison
- Jameson
- James (disambiguation)
- James (surname)
