= Jemison =

Jemison may refer to:

- Jemison, Alabama, U.S. city
- Jemison (surname)
- Jemison High School (Huntsville, Alabama)
- Jemison High School (Jemison, Alabama)

== See also ==
- Jamison (disambiguation)
