= David Jamison =

David Jamison may refer to:

- David Jamison (skier), American para-alpine skier
- David Jamison (politician) (1660–1739), Scottish-American judge and official
- David Flavel Jamison, president of the South Carolina Secession Convention of 1860

== See also ==
- David Jamieson (disambiguation)
- David Jameson (disambiguation)
