= Thomas Hill Jamieson =

Scottish librarian

Thomas Hill Jamieson (1843–1876) was a Scottish librarian.

== Biography ==
Jamieson, born in August 1843 at Bonnington, near Arbroath, in Scotland, was educated at the burgh and parochial school of that town, and afterwards (1862) at Edinburgh High School and University. While still at college he acted as a sub-editor of Chambers's Etymological Dictionary, and subsequently became assistant to Samuel Halkett, librarian of the Advocates' Library.

In June 1871, on Halkett's death, Jamieson was appointed keeper of the library, and the work of printing the catalogue passed into his care. In 1872 he wrote a prefatory notice for an edition of Archie Armstrong's Banquet of Jests, and in 1874 edited a reprint of Barclay's translation of Brandt's Ship of Fools, to which he prefixed a notice of Sebastian Brandt and his writings. In 1874 he also privately printed a Notice of the Life and Writings of Alexander Barclay.

The fire which occurred in the Advocates' Library in the summer of 1875 roused him to exertions beyond his strength, and he died at 7 Gillespie Crescent, Edinburgh, on 9 January 1876, aged only 32. He married, on 11 June 1872, Jane Alison Kilgour, by whom he left two children.
