= James Jamerson (disambiguation) =

James Jamerson (1936–1983) was an American bass player.

James Jamerson may also refer to:

- James Jamerson Jr. (1957–2016), son of the above, American bass player, member of the band Chanson
- James L. Jamerson (born 1941), United States Air Force general

== See also ==
- James Jameson (disambiguation)
- James Jamieson (disambiguation)
