= Advocates Library =

Law library of the Faculty of Advocates, in Edinburgh

Coordinates: 55°56′56″N 3°11′29″W

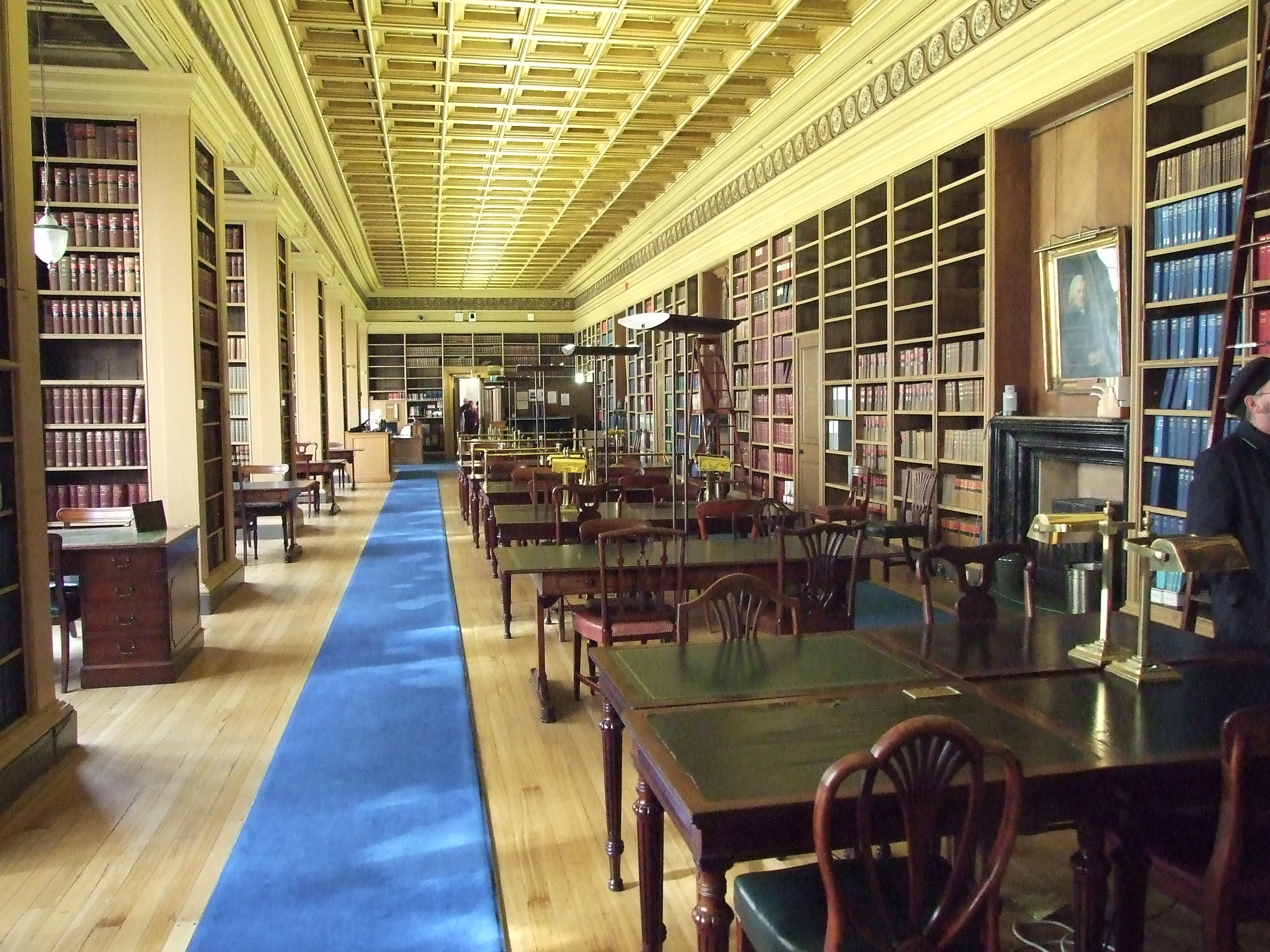
Interior of the Advocates Library

The Advocates Library, founded in 1682, is the law library of the Faculty of Advocates, in Edinburgh, Scotland. It served as the national deposit library of Scotland until 1925, at which time through an act of Parliament, the National Library of Scotland Act 1925 (15 & 16 Geo. 5. c. 73), the National Library of Scotland was created. All the non-legal collections were transferred to the National Library. Today, it alone of the Scottish libraries still holds the privilege of receiving a copy of every law book entered at Stationers' Hall.

The library forms part of the complex that includes Parliament House, located on the Royal Mile.

== History ==
The library was formally opened in 1689. It was an initiative of George Mackenzie.

The present library building was designed by William Henry Playfair in 1830, and is a category A listed building.

Librarian Samuel Halkett began an ambitious catalogue, based on the rules of John Winter Jones for the British Museum catalogue of 1839, but with extensive biographical information on authors. It was published in six volumes, from 1858 to 1878. Halkett's successor, Thomas Hill Jamieson, had to deal with a fire that damaged some thousands of books on 9 March 1875.

By 1923 the library held around 725,000 books and pamphlets.

== Keepers ==
- 1684–1693 James Nasmith (NB in place before official opening.)
- 1693–1702 James Stevenson
- 1702–1728 John Spottiswoode of that ilk
- 1703–1718 (joint keeper) Adam Colt or Coult
- 1705–1719 (joint keeper) William Forbes
- 1730–1752 Thomas Ruddiman
- 1735–1766 (assistant keeper) Walter Goodall
- 1752–1757 David Hume
- 1757–1758 Adam Ferguson
- 1758–1765 William Wallace
- 1766–1794 Alexander Brown
- 1794–1818 Alexander Manners
- 1820–1848 David Irving
- 1849–1871 Samuel Halkett
- 1871–1876 Thomas Hill Jamieson
- 1877–1906 James Toshach Clark
- 1906–1925 William Kirk Dickson
- 1925–1928 James Stevenson Leadbetter
- 1928–1948 Robert Candlish Henderson
- 1948–1949 Henry Wallace Guthrie
- 1949–1956 Thomas Pringle McDonald
- 1956–1970 Margaret Henderson Kidd
- 1970–1972 Alexander John Mackenzie Stuart
- 1972–1977 Charles Kemp Davidson
- 1977–1987 John Taylor Cameron
- 1987–1994 Brian Gill
- 1994–2002 Angus Stewart
- 2002–2004 Edgar Prais
- 2004–2008 Stephen Woolman
- 2008–2021 Mungo Bovey QC
- 2021 Stephen O'Rourke QC
- 2022–present Neil Mackenzie KC

== See also ==
- Edinburgh City Chambers
