= Alcinous Burton Jamison =

American physician, socialite, and occultist (1851–1938)

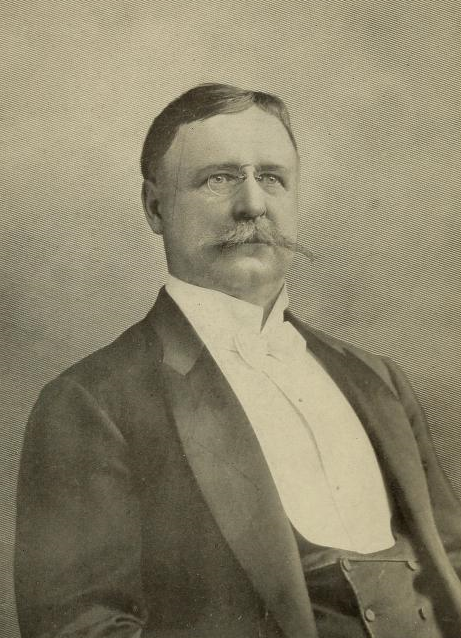
- Born: September 1, 1851; Wooster, Ohio
- Died: November 15, 1938 (aged 87); New York City, New York
- Education: M.D.
- Alma mater: Fort Wayne College of Medicine
- Occupation: Physician
- Spouse: Mary Ernestine Schmid
- Writing career
- Language: English

Alcinous Burton Jamison (September 1, 1851 – November 15, 1938) was an American physician, inventor of medical devices, socialite, and occultist.

== Early life ==
Jamison was born at Wooster, Ohio. On his father's side, his earliest ancestor in America arrived before the American Revolution from Scotland.

== Education ==
Jamison's family seems to have moved back to Indiana from Ohio, because he received his education at Indiana State Normal School and Fort Wayne (Indiana) College before finally receiving a diploma in 1878 from Fort Wayne College of Medicine.

== Family ==
On June 17, 1891 Jamison married Mary Ernestine Schmid, daughter of prosperous area merchants of Swiss descent. By 1899 the Jamisons were part of New York City high society, with Mrs. Jamison participating in activities with the Minerva Club and Jamison appearing in the 1930 New York Social Blue Book.

== Career ==
Jamison's first job was as a schoolteacher. Although he graduated from medical school in 1878, he began his practice in 1877 in Portland, IN. In 1878 he practiced in Decatur, IN; in 1882 he moved to Grand Rapids, MI; in 1883 to Detroit, MI; and finally in 1885 to New York City. Jamison's medical career was as a proctologist. He was an adherent of the theory of auto-intoxication, and advocated treating problems associated with the rectum by means of an enema. In this he was akin to his contemporary Charles Alfred Tyrrell, who published his book, Intestinal Ills. Jamison was a prolific writer where his area of interest was concerned, and many of his books remain in print.

Jamison also wrote an advertising brochure for Eager Colon Cleanser Company, which issued brochure titled: “Dr. A. B. Jamison’s Fourteen Reasons ‘Why the Internal Bath’”.

Like Tyrrell, Jamison patented, and sold an enema appliance. It was called the "Internal Fountain Bath". Additionally, he was a "compounder of a number of lotions and salves, which, in combination with his other treatment, are used in lieu of the usual surgery." Jamison's Eager Colon Cleanser and Internal Fountain Bath are cited as examples of quackery in modern literature.

Jamison was also interested in matters of the occult and spiritualism. His biographical sketch in The Successful American notes that “Dr. Jamison has from time to time contributed valuable articles to the press on the study of Psychic Phenomena.” In the 1922 edition of his Man: Whence and Whither, Jamison included a foreword by John Emery Mcclain that said, "[Jamison] is gifted with a clairvoyant faculty that enables him to see certain things and discern operations of natural law that are at present hidden from more than 99 percent. of the human race." Jamison appears in Who’s Who in Occultism, New Thought Psychism and Spiritualism, described as a "psychic investigator." (1927)

== Death ==
Jamison died 15 Nov 1938 in St. Luke’s Hospital in New York City of arteriosclerotic heart disease.

== Other ==
Listed in:

- Herringshaw's American Blue-book of Biography.
- Directory of Homeopathic Physicians in Greater New York and Vicinity
- The Standard Medical Directory of North America (1902)
- The Medical Directory of New York, New Jersey, and Connecticut (Vol. 23)

== Works ==
=== Books ===
- The Anus and Rectum: Their Physiology, Anatomy and Pathology (1897)
- Intestinal Ills: Chronic Constipation and Auto-Intoxication due to Proctitis and Colitis (1901)
- Intestinal Irrigation: Or, Why, How, and When to Flush the Colon (1903, 1914)
- Man: Whence and Whither (1922)
- The Making of a Super-Race (1926)
- Spirit mans Place and Function in Nature (1933)

=== Articles ===
- "How to Become Strong"
- "Autogenetic Poisons in the Intestinal Canal and their Autoinfection"
- "Rectal and Ano-Rectal Mucous Sac – Commonly Called External and Internal Piles, or Hemorrhoids"
- "The Origin and Use of the Enema"
- "Constipation, the Cause of Many Ills"
- "The Field and Function of the Psychotherapist"
