= John Jameson =

John Jameson may refer to:

- John Jameson (1740–1823), Scottish founder of Jameson Irish Whiskey
- John Jameson (politician) (1802–1857), American lawyer and Congressman from Missouri
- John Jameson (colonel) (1751–1810), Continental Army soldier who helped discover Benedict Arnold's treason
- John Jameson (character), fictional Marvel character known as "the Man-Wolf"
- John Jameson (cricketer) (1941–2025), English cricketer
- Johnny Jameson (born 1958), Northern Irish footballer
- John Gordon Jameson (1878–1955), British Member of Parliament for Edinburgh West, 1918–1922
- John Eustace Jameson (1853–1919), Member of Parliament for West Clare, 1895–1906
- John Paul Jameson (c. 1659–1700), Scottish Roman Catholic priest and antiquarian

== See also ==
- Jameson (name)
