= Thomas Jameson =

Thomas Jameson may refer to:

- Thomas Jameson (cricketer, born 1908) (1908–1989), played for Hampshire
- Thomas Jameson (cricketer, born 1946), played for Cambridge University and Warwickshire
- Tom Jameson (1892–1965), Irish cricketer
