= Archie Lewis =

Jamaican singer (1918–1988)

Edward Archibald Lewis (10 April 1918– 29 February 1988) was a Jamaican singer who was popular in Britain in the 1940s.

== Career ==
Archie Lewis sang in choirs and was a Sunday school teacher before taking up singing as a career. Already one of the most popular singers in Jamaica, he migrated to Britain in 1942 to work in a munitions factory as part of the war effort, and became the featured singer with Geraldo and his Orchestra, with whom he recorded. He also appeared regularly on BBC radio. He had a "rich baritone voice" and specialised in romantic ballads. He was one of the first black vocalists to sing solo in public performances in England, and toured widely with Geraldo and with Josephine Baker, as well as performing at the London Palladium and at a Royal Command Performance. For a time he was seen as one of Britain's most popular singers, and was known as "the Crosby of the Caribbean". His version of "In the Land of Beginning Again", recorded in 1946, was one of the most popular songs of its time, and his recording of "While the Angelus Was Ringing", sung with the Luton Girls Choir in 1948, was reported to have sold over a million copies.

After some time in Germany, Lewis returned to Jamaica in 1964 and performed in the island's leading hotels and clubs. In 1967, he was reported as being about to tour in Canada and the United States. He recorded three albums in Jamaica in the late 1960s and early 1970s: The Voice of Love, In Jamaica, and I'll Remember Jamaica.

He died in the University Hospital, Mona, Jamaica, in 1988 at the age of 69.

== Discography ==
=== Albums ===
- The Voice of Love (1968), Hilary/WIRL
- In Jamaica (1972), Federal

Compilations

- I'll Remember Jamaica (1968), Federal
- Sincerely Yours (1982), Decca - Archie Lewis featuring Geraldo and his Orchestra
- A Voice to Remember! (2003), Good Music Record Co.
- Swing Low Sweet Chariot (2010), Cornerstone Media
