= Robert Jamieson =

Robert Jamieson may refer to:

- Robert Jamieson (moderator) (1802–1880), moderator of the General Assembly of the Church of Scotland in 1872
- Bob Jamieson, American television journalist
- Craig Jamieson (Robert Craig Jamieson, born 1953), Cambridge academic
- Robert Jamieson (antiquary) (1772–1844), Scottish antiquary
- Robert Jamieson (merchant) (died 1861), London promoter of West African commerce
- Robert Jamieson (1802–1880), co-editor of the Jamieson-Fausset-Brown Bible Commentary
- Robert Jamieson (chess player) (born 1952), Australian chess player
- Robert Alan Jamieson (born 1958), Shetland dialect poet and novelist
- Robert Stuart Jamieson (1922–2006), musician, author, engineer, inventor, and patent agent

== See also ==
- Robert Jameson (disambiguation)
