= David Jamieson =

David Jamieson may refer to:

- David Jamieson (British politician) (born 1947), West Midlands Police and Crime Commissioner and former British Member of Parliament
- David Jamieson (Canadian politician) (1856–1942), speaker of the Legislature of Ontario
- David Jamieson (VC) (1920–2001), English recipient of the Victoria Cross
- David Jamieson (rugby union), Scottish rugby player
- David Ewan Jamieson (1930–2013), Royal New Zealand Air Force officer

== See also ==
- David Jamison (disambiguation)
- David Jameson (disambiguation)
