= Freddie Jameson =

English trumpet player, composer and arranger (1929–2016)

Frederick William Jameson (4 October 1929 – 12 October 2016) was an English trumpet player, composer and arranger who worked for several leading British bandleaders in the 1950s and 1960s.

== Life and career ==
Born in London on 4 October 1929, Jameson was educated at Battersea Grammar School where he played cornet in the Cadet Corps Brass Band under the direction of Dr Harold Hind. In 1945, he began playing in the Crystal Palace Brass Band, conducted by Dr Dennis Wright, before serving as a musician in the Royal Air Force with the Band of the Royal Air Force Regiment and No 4 Regional Band.

In 1951, whilst still in the RAF, Jameson was coached by Alfie Noakes of the Geraldo Orchestra, and began professional engagements on trumpet with the Joe Loss 'Ambassadors', and went on to play with Billy Ternent, Harry Parry, Joe Loss, Sidney Lipton, the Cyril Grantham Orchestra at the Park Lane Hotel, Claude Cavalotti, Nat Temple, and Geraldo – for whom he also appeared on the cruise liner Queen Mary, making seventeen return trips to New York City.

Jameson later worked on numerous film productions including Chitty Chitty Bang Bang, and also worked for the West End theatre impresario Jack Hylton under the musical direction of Cyril Ornadel on the shows Wish You Were Here, Pal Joey, Kismet, and The Crazy Gang shows at the Victoria Palace Theatre which starred Flanagan and Allen. From 1958 to 1963 he worked on the original hit West End production of the musical, My Fair Lady, at the Drury Lane Theatre, which starred Rex Harrison and Julie Andrews.

Jameson later worked as a composer and arranger and wrote marches which have been adopted and performed by the bands of the Royal Air Force. He later served as Vice-Chairman of the Royal Air Force Music Services Association, a member of the International Military Music Society (IMMS), and Musical Director of the Thames Television Big Band.

Jameson died on 12 October 2016, at the age of 87.
