= James Jameson (disambiguation) =

James Jameson (1824–1896) was a New Zealand mayor.

James Jameson may also refer to:

- James Jameson Dickson (1815–1885), Scottish Swedish logging industrialist and philanthropist
- James Jameson (priest) (1828–1899), Archdeacon of Leighlin
- James Jameson (British Army officer) (1837–1904), British army surgeon
- James Sligo Jameson (1856–1888), Scottish naturalist and African traveller

== See also ==
- James Jamerson (disambiguation)
- James Jamieson (disambiguation)
