= Geraldo (bandleader) =

English bandleader (1904–1974)

- 1935 Wills' cigarette card

Background information
- Born: Gerald Walcan Bright; 10 August 1904; London, England
- Died: 4 May 1974 (aged 69) Vevey, Switzerland
- Genres: Swing, dance band, sweet jazz
- Occupations: Bandleader, composer, conductor
- Instruments: Piano, organ
- Years active: 1930–1960s

Gerald Walcan Bright (10 August 1904 – 4 May 1974), better known as Geraldo, was an English bandleader. He adopted the name "Geraldo" in 1930, and became one of the most popular British dance band leaders of the 1930s with his "sweet music" and his "Gaucho Tango Orchestra". During the 1940s, he modernised his style and continued to enjoy great success.

== Biography ==
Gerald Walcan Bright was born in London, where he played piano and organ and studied at the Royal Academy of Music. He started his career as a pianist playing for silent films.

Geraldo became a major figure on the British entertainment scene for four decades, having fronted just about every kind of ensemble and influenced the successful careers of numerous top singers. For his broadcasts he varied the style of his orchestra quite considerably, and a particular series Tip Top Tunes (employing a full string section alongside the usual dance band) enjoyed great popularity. Several commercial recordings were made, spotlighting the considerable arranging talents of the young Wally Stott (better known in the United States as Angela Morley).

Over the years, most of the UK's top musicians played with Geraldo's orchestra, including Ted Heath, who played first trombone in the orchestra before leaving to form his own band and the guitarist Ken Sykora, later to become a respected radio personality, and trumpeter Freddie Jameson.

In the 1950s, he composed Scotlandia, Scottish Television's start-up music, heard daily at the beginning of programmes until the 1980s.

Geraldo was married to Manya Leigh of London. He died in 1974 from a heart attack, age 69, while on holiday in Vevey, Switzerland. He is buried alongside his wife, Manya, at Willesden Jewish Cemetery in London.

Specialist dance band radio stations, such as Radio Dismuke, continue to play his records. Geraldo also features regularly on the Manx Radio programme Sweet & Swing, presented by Howard Caine.

== "Geraldo's Navy" ==
After World War II, Geraldo also ran an agency from his offices at 73 New Bond Street in London. In addition to booking bands for theatres and hotels, he placed musicians on transatlantic and cruise liners – in the music business this was known as "Geraldo's Navy".

From the mid-1930s for a period of some 20 years, American musicians were banned from performing in the UK by the British Musicians Union. The ban was in retaliation for a similar restriction in the US which prevented British musicians from working in the States. It was especially frustrating for post-war British jazzmen who wanted to see and hear their American idols. However, one way for them to cross the Atlantic was to join the dance bands of Cunard liners such as the Queen Mary, Queen Elizabeth, Mauretania and the QE2, or Canadian Pacific vessels such as the Empress of England and the Empress of Canada. The Cunarders were especially popular because when they had docked in New York, the musicians would have one or two nights free to visit jazz venues like Birdland on Broadway, just north of West 52nd Street in Manhattan, or clubs in Greenwich Village. Some even arranged to take lessons with American stars during their shore leave: for example, Bruce Turner took saxophone lessons with Lee Konitz.

In the public rooms of the liners, the musicians were required to play strict tempo dance music, but they would sometimes slip in the odd jazz number – especially if there was a chance that a celebrity passenger might sit in. Duke Ellington is known to have played piano with the ship's dance band when he crossed from New York to Southampton aboard the Queen Mary in the late 1950s.

Many well-known figures in British post-war jazz "served" in Geraldo's musical navy, such as John Dankworth, Benny Green, Bill Le Sage, Ronnie Scott, and Stan Tracey.

== Orchestra ==
The Geraldo Orchestra from 1940 to 1947:

- Gerald Bright (Geraldo), conductor
  - Sid Bright (twin brother of Gerald) – piano
  - Jack Collier – bass
  - Maurice Burman – drums
  - Ivor Mairants – guitar
  - Alfie Noakes, Basil Jones, Flash Shields, Leslie Hutchinson – trumpets
  - Ted Heath, Eric Tann, Joe Ferrie, Jimmy Coombes – trombones
  - Harry Hayes (Chipper), Nat Temple, Dougie Robinson, George Evans, Arthur Birkby, Phil Goody – saxes
  - Georgia Lee, Dorothy Carless, Doreen Villiers, Len Camber, Beryl Davies, J. Hunter, Johnny Green, Derek Roy, Sally Douglas – vocals.

Eric Delaney (drums) came in December 1946 and, apart from one short period, stayed until May 1954. Other noted names in the band (1946/47 period and prior) included Wally Stott, Keith Bird, Bob Adams (saxes) and Eddie Calvert (trumpet). Archie Lewis, Dick James, Margaret Rose and Carole Carr were vocalists of note.

== Filmography ==
As an actor:

- No Parking (1938)
- Dance Hall (1950) (uncredited) – orchestra leader
- We'll Meet Again (1943)
- Laugh It Off (1940)

As himself:

- Road House (1934)
- School for Stars (1935)
- London Melody (1937) (uncredited)
- Tin Pan Alley (1951)

As musical director

- Limelight (1936)
- Three Maxims (1936)
- Sunset in Vienna (1937)
- Millions (1937)

== Discography ==
- Geraldo And His Orchestra (World 1974)
- Hello Again ... Again (Transatlantic 1976)
- 50 Hits Of The Naughty 40s (Pickwick 1977)
- Gerry's Music Shop (Decca 1980)
- Heart And Soul (HMV 1983)
- Jealousy (with the Gaucho Tango Orchestra) (Parlophone 1983)
- The Golden Age Of Geraldo (EMI 1986)
- The Man And His Music (EMI 1992)
- The Dance Band Years (Pulse 1997)
