= Jamison, California =

Jamison
- Former settlement
- Location in California
- Coordinates: 39°46′34″N 120°40′56″W
- Country: United States
- State: California
- County: Plumas
- Elevation: 4,774 ft (1,455 m)

Jamison (also, Jamieson City) is a former settlement in Plumas County, California, United States. It lay at an elevation of 4774 feet (1455 m). Jamison is located 1.25 miles (2.0 km) north-northeast of Johnsville.

The Jamison post office operated from 1871 to 1877 and from 1880 to 1882.
