= Nat Temple =

British musician (1913–2008)

Nathan Temple (18 July 1913 – 30 May 2008) was an English big band leader, and a clarinet and saxophone player.

Amongst many others, he worked with Syd Roy, Harry Roy, Geraldo, Ambrose, Joe Daniels, and Lew Stone.

== Early life ==
He was born Nathan Tempelhoff, the son of a tailor in Stepney, London.

== Career ==
Temple formed his own band in 1944, and worked with Benny Lee, Frankie Vaughan, Joy Nichols, Lita Roza, David Whitfield, Anne Shelton, Beryl Davis, Julie Andrews and The Keynotes.

After World War II, Temple worked with Bernard Braden and Barbara Kelly on Breakfast with Braden, along with the BBC announcer, Ronald Fletcher. Temple's band also played on the radio show Music While You Work until 1983.

On television, he provided the band for Crackerjack with Eamonn Andrews, as well as Nuts in May with Frankie Howerd, The Time of Your Life with Noel Edmonds, The Russell Harty Show, Tune Times With Temple, A Jolly Good Time, Dance Music Through the Ages and Starstruck.

Other people who worked with Temple included Eartha Kitt, Petula Clark, George Shearing, Larry Grayson, Fred Perry, Joyce Grenfell, Matt Monro, Kenneth Horne, Mel Tormé and Paul Daniels.

== Personal life and death ==
Temple was married to Freda for over 62 years. She died on 5 June 2005. They had four daughters and six grandchildren.

He stopped playing live around 2004, and lived near Woking, Surrey.

Nat Temple died at home on 30 May 2008, aged 94.
