= Mercedes Jamison =

American artist (1933–1997)

- Born: 1933; Queens, New York, U.S.
- Died: 1997; Queens, New York, U.S.
- Known for: Painting
- Movement: Outsider art
- Patron(s): Victor Musgrave

Mercedes Jamison (1933–1997) was an American artist based in Queens, New York known especially for the paintings of fragmented faces and landscapes she created while affiliated with HAI (Hospital Audiences Inc.).

== Life and work ==
Mercedes Jamison was a New York outsider artist. Throughout her life she suffered from mental illness. Though she worked in many different mediums, she is best known for the paintings of animals, landscapes and faces that she created in her later years. These works were primarily painted in acrylic, are loose in structure painted in bright colors often featuring the color yellow.

== Collections and exhibitions ==
Mercedes Jamison's work was collected by Victor Musgrave and is part of the Musgrave Kinley Outsider Art Collection. As of 2019 the Musgrave Kinley Outsider Art Collection is held by The Whitworth. From 2000 to 2010 the Musgrave Kinley Outsider Art Collection was on loan to IMMA.

Jamison's work was featured in the 2019 White Columns exhibit HEALING ARTS! - work from the archives of Healing Arts Initiative / H.A.I.. She was shown in the 2008 exhibit An Outsider Retrospective at The Gallery at HAI.

== Recognition ==
Mercedes Jamison is one of the six artists spotlighted in the 1995 film Not Like in the Movies: A Portrait of Six Mentally Ill Artists at Work, along with: Irene Phillips, Rocco Fama, Lady Shalimar Montague and Ray Hamilton.
