= James Jamieson =

James Jamieson may refer to:

== Sportspeople ==
- James Jamieson (dancer) (1920–1993), Highland dancer
- James Jamieson (ice hockey) (1922–1985), hockey player
- Jim Jamieson (1943–2018), U.S. golfer
- Jimmy Jamieson (fl. 1890s), Scottish footballer with Everton, Sheffield Wednesday

== Others ==
- James Jamieson, Baron Jamieson, British councillor and Conservative life peer
- James Jamieson (Australian doctor) (1840–1916), Scottish-born doctor, active in Australia
- James Jamieson (New Zealand doctor) (1880–1963), Scottish-born doctor, active in New Zealand
- James P. Jamieson (1867–1941), Missouri architect
- James Edgar Jamieson (1873–1958), Ontario farmer and political figure
- James Jamieson (dentist) (1875–1966), Scottish dentist and author
- James D. Jamieson (born 1934), cell biologist

== See also ==
- James Jamerson (disambiguation)
- James Jameson (disambiguation)
