= Andrew Jameson =

Andrew Jameson may refer to:

- Andrew Jameson, Lord Ardwall (1845–1911), Scottish barrister and judge
- Andrew Jameson (politician) (1855–1941), Irish politician, businessman and public servant
- Andy Jameson (born 1965), English swimmer and sports commentator

== See also ==
- Andrew Jamieson, Scottish engineer and academic author
