= Robert Stuart Jamieson =

American musician, writer and engineer

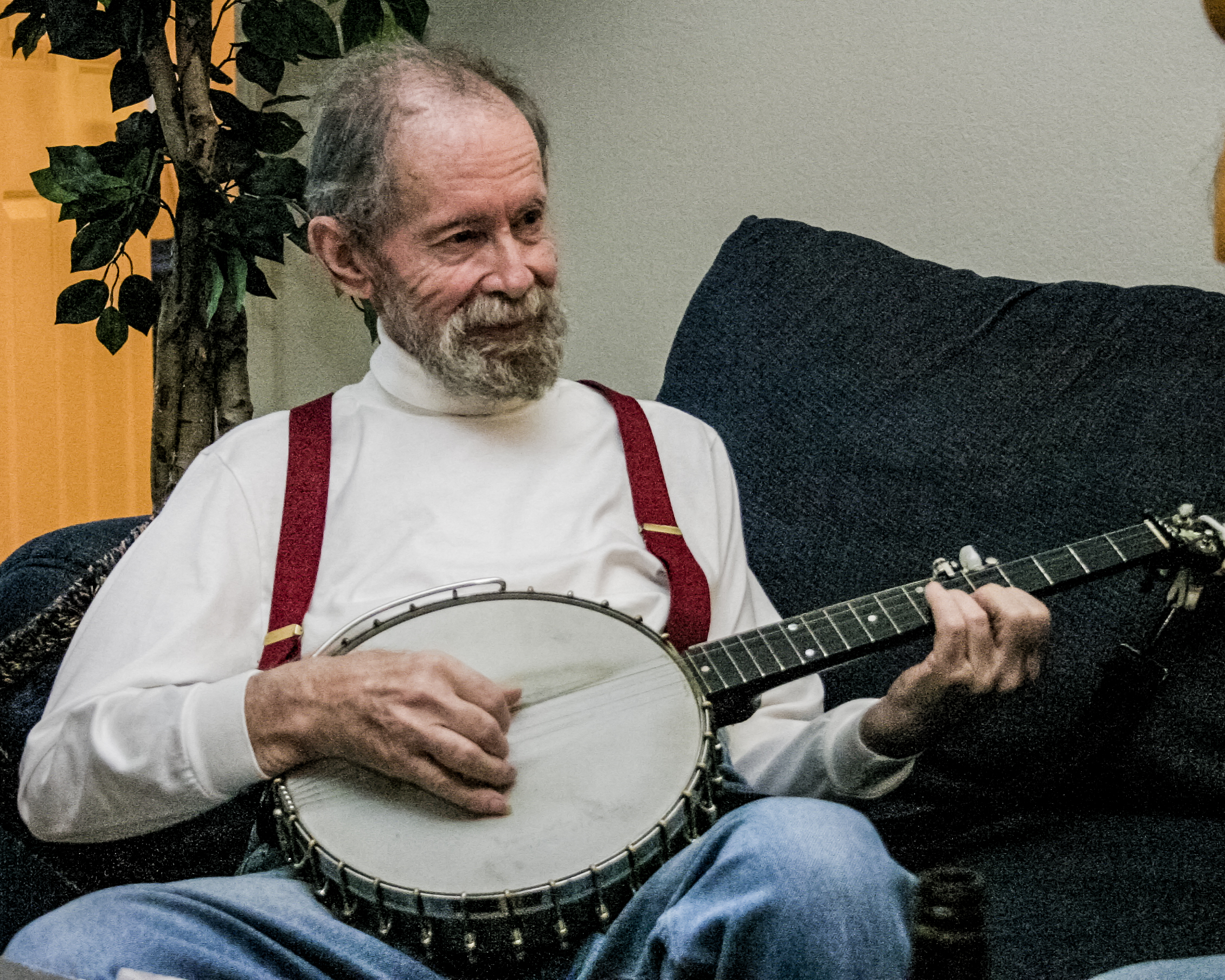
- Jamieson with a 5-string banjo
- Born: February 26, 1922; Gansu, China
- Died: September 23, 2006 (aged 84); Orlando, Florida, U.S.
- Occupations: Musician, writer, engineer, inventor, patent agent
- Military career
- Branch: United States Army
- Service years: 1942–1945
- Rank: Private First Class
- Musical career
- Genres: American folk music
- Instruments: Banjo, vocalist

Robert Stuart (Stu) Jamieson (February 26, 1922 – September 23, 2006) was a musician, author, engineer, inventor, and patent agent. He was a dual-citizen of both Canada and the United States, and served in the 90th Chemical Mortar Battalion of the U.S. Army during the Second World War. As a musician, he is credited with preserving Anglo-American, African-American, and Chinese folk music for the Library of Congress in addition to publishing several records in the United States.

== Early life and influence ==
Robert Stuart Jamieson was born into a family of Pentecostal missionaries in the rural Chinese province of Gansu. His mother, Margaret Jamieson, was the first white child born in Northwestern China. Reports indicate that locals traveled upwards of 10 days to see the phenomenon. Robert's grandfather, William Wallace Simpson had left his home in the mountains of Tennessee to spread the gospel in North Western China, carrying his 5-string banjo with him. The musical styles that William Wallace brought to China continue to influence folk music in the region to this day. It was William Wallace's musical tradition that inspired Robert Jamieson to play the banjo.

The Chinese Civil War of 1927 saw an ultra-nationalist purging of foreign influences in Chinese culture, which culminated in the expulsion of non-Chinese ethnicities. Escaping along the Yellow River, Jamieson's family managed to escape to safety. It was on this river escape that the family decided to return to the United States, and Jamieson's mother realized that her children spoke only Chinese.

Upon his move to the United States, Robert Jamieson settled in New York, where he became involved with folk and square-dance culture. It was here that he met Margot Mayo, a well-respected folk musician that influenced much of Jamieson's early style. Together Jamieson and Mayo set out to record and archive American banjo music of the South and Appalachian regions. During these recording sessions, Jamieson was able to record a number of pieces by Rufus Crisp, a well published banjo player. Jamieson later remarked that much of his style was influenced by Crisp's style.

== Military service ==
In 1942, at the age of 18, after settling in New York State where he was introduced to square dance culture, Robert Jamieson joined the United States Army. After completion of basic training, Jamieson became an acting Sergeant as a non-combatant drill instructor. He eventually transferred to the 90th Chemical Mortar Battalion, promoted to Private First Class when General Eisenhower declared that all Privates were to be promoted to Private First Class before being sent to the European theater of the Second World War. PFC Jamieson encountered heavy fighting on the Western Front and approached the front line just before Allied forces crossed the Rhine River into Germany. His unit crossed into Germany near Linz-am-Rhine and Erpel.

Notorious for their use of White Phosphorus against German tanks, the 90th Chemical mortar Battalion would later be referenced by Jamieson in his autobiography and personal recounting of the war, titled "88! 89! 90th!" His book was written for the Veteran History Project of the Library of Congress, and is currently available to read there. In his book, Jamieson recalls several combat engagements with infantry, armored tank divisions, and aircraft. Throughout Europe he worked mostly with mortar crews. In his book he recalls that his brother, Donnie Paul Jamieson, was killed by a German mine several weeks before the suicide of Adolf Hitler.

Shortly after Hitler's death, Jamieson was reassigned to Charlie Company of the 90th Mortar Battalion, and eventually assigned as a guard in an Allied prison camp, where he remained until the end of his deployment.

== Historical contributions and preservation ==
Upon returning from World War II, Jamieson become concerned that increasing use and culture surrounding radios in the United States would have a negative impact on the surviving musical and folk traditions of America. He teamed up with Margot Mayo, an accomplished folk musician in Tennessee, to preserve samples of musical styles and techniques with the 5-string banjo. Together, they amassed several hundred hours of audio recordings that have since been archived in the Library of Congress Folk Center that hold samples of music played with varying techniques and musical styles. These recordings serve as a historical reference for the folk styles that developed and spread in the Appalachian Mountains. The styles are characteristic of Scots-Irish, Anglo, African, and Native musical styles which have influenced American folk music in rural areas since the development of banjos by African slaves in the 18th century.

The most extensive of Jamieson's and Mayo's work was designated "The Margaret Mayo Collection" in the Library of Congress, with an original copy residing in the Folk Center of the Library. It was published on 10-inch, 12-inch, 5-inch, and 7-inch tapes in the late 1940s, and contains dozens of hours of samples of music performed by multiple artists that display their varying play styles, including Murphy Gribble, an accomplished and prolific Appalachian banjo figure of the mid twentieth century that combined Anglo-Irish, French, German, Native American, and African musical traditions.

Jamieson produced many albums and collections of music, and many have since made their way into the Library of Congress archives, including titles such as "Anglo-American Song and Ballads," recorded in 1947. This collection strayed from Appalachian music styles and included folk music of the American folk music from various periods and settings. Among these were Sea Shanties, Western Cowboy Hymns, Mormon music from their Western migrations, Ballads of the Civil War, and Negro spirituals.

== List of works and collaborations ==
- Banjos, Lamas, & Bagpipes, self-produced, 1996

Considered by Jamieson to be a culmination of his musical influences, this recording features musical styles of Anglo-American, Irish, Scottish, Chinese, African, Caribbean and Tibetan influences. Vocals are in English, Chinese, and Gaelic. Instruments include the five-string banjo, the harpsichord, fiddles, cellos, harmonica, and spoons. This recording has numerous examples of one of Jamieson's signature banjo-styles, known as frailing.

- Anglo American Songs and Ballads from the archive of folk song, Edited by Duncan Emrich, From the Library of Congress Archives, 1947

This collection various artists includes Sea shanties, music of Western expansion, Mormon musical tradition, Civil War ballads of both Union and Confederate origin, and Negro spirituals as well as work songs from the musical traditions of American slavery. 3 songs on this album, played by the King family are considered to be of an originally American style, with no European antecedents.

- Robert Stuart Jamieson Wire Recording, Library of Congress Archive, 1949

This album was created by Robert Jamieson and originally recorded on a wire spool in Campaign, Tennessee, hence its name. It features Murphy Gribble, who Jamieson considered to be one of the greatest banjo players of all time. This is the only solo recording of Murphy Gribble. It includes mainly dance tunes and African-American string band music.

- Margaret Mayo Collection, Library of Congress Archive, Recorded throughout the 1940s

Printed on 10", 12", 5", and 7" tapes in the 1940s, this collection served as a compilation of various banjo styles and methods of play for the sole purpose of historical preservation in the archives of the Library of Congress.
