= Percy Jameson =

English footballer

Personal information
- Full name: Percy Jameson
- Date of birth: 21 July 1917
- Place of birth: Sunderland, England
- Date of death: 1981 (aged 63)
- Place of death: Gateshead, England
- Height: 5 ft 10 1/2 in (1.79 m)
- Positions: Wing half; inside forward

Youth career
- St Gabriel's

Senior career*
Years	Team	Apps	(Gls)
1933–193?	Sunderland	0	(0)
1936–194?	Darlington	1	(0)
- * Club domestic league appearances and goals

Percy Jameson (21 July 1917 – 1981) was an English amateur footballer who played in the Football League for Darlington.

Jameson was born in Sunderland in 1917, the son of Percy Jameson, an electrical engineer, and his wife Alice née Daglish. He had two older siblings, Harold and Margaret. He signed for Sunderland from St Gabriel's as a "well-built young inside right" in the 1933 close season. He made no senior appearances for the club, and in 1936 signed amateur forms for Third Division North club Darlington, by which time he was playing either as a wing half or at inside forward. He made what proved to be his only senior appearance for the club, and only appearance in the Football League, playing at centre forward in a 1–0 win at home to Halifax Town on 1 April 1939. At the time of his wedding to Ada Scriven at Brunswick Methodist Chapel, Stockton-on-Tees, in 1943, Jameson was still a member of the Darlington club. His death at the age of 63 was registered in Sunderland in 1981.
