= Bert Jameson =

Bert Desmond Jameson was an Anglican priest in the 20th century.

An Australian, Jameson was educated at Moore Theological College. He was ordained deacon in 1945, and priest in 1946. After curacies in Westport and Nelson he held incumbencies at Ahaura, Brunerton and Tākaka. He was the Archdeacon of Māwhera from 1961 until 1970; and of Waimea from 1971 to 1978.
