= Matthew Jamison =

Matthew Jamison may refer to:

- Matthew Jamison of Henry Jackson Society
- Matt Jamison, fictional character in The Leftovers
