= Nicole LaPointe Jameson =

American businesswoman (born 1994)

- Born: April 11, 1994 (age 32); Connecticut, United States
- Education: Columbia University (B.A.S.)
- Occupation: Former CEO of Evil Geniuses
- Honors: Forbes 30 Under 30 - Games (2020); The Root 100 (2020)

Nicole LaPointe Jameson (a.k.a. Nicole Prim) (born April 11, 1994) is an American businesswoman who was the CEO of esports organization Evil Geniuses from 2019 to 2023.

== Early life and career ==
A native of Greenwich, Connecticut, LaPointe Jameson attended Columbia University in New York City, graduating in 2016. During the summer of her junior year, she received a job offer to join Chicago-based investment firm PEAK6. She worked with several distressed asset businesses for five years before coming across Evil Geniuses, which she described as a "diamond in the rough." PEAK6 would later acquire Evil Geniuses in May 2019, installing LaPointe Jameson as the organization's new CEO.

In September 2019, the organization made their return to League of Legends and Counter-Strike: Global Offensive, securing a franchise slot in the League of Legends Championship Series, along with acquiring NRG Esports' CS:GO roster. The organization also doubled their staff count and opened new offices in Seattle and Los Angeles within a year of LaPointe Jameson's tenure.

LaPointe Jameson was featured in the 2020 Forbes 30 Under 30 under the games category.

In January 2021, Evil Geniuses became the first major esports team to sign a mixed-gender squad for Valorant. In a tweet, LaPointe Jameson stated, "I don’t care where you come from. Nor your creed, gender, religion, class, past industry, or sexual orientation. If you are the best of the best, you have a home here at Evil Geniuses." In August 2021, the squad's only female player, Christine "potter" Chi, moved to a head coach position; she led the squad to win the Valorant Champions in 2023.

In March 2023, Dexerto reported that Evil Geniuses had failed to care for the mental health of star League of Legends player Kyle "Danny" Sakamaki, who played for the team from 2020 to 2022. Despite numerous warnings from the player himself, other players, and staff about his deteriorating health, upper management and LaPointe Jameson convinced Sakamaki to keep playing tournaments. Sakamaki eventually announced a mental health break from the team during the middle of playoffs, and returned home where he was hospitalized for malnutrition. The events prompted an investigation by Riot Games.

In September 2023, LaPointe Jameson stepped down from her role as CEO amid several other controversies. Employees reported poor and inexperienced management, and ex-player Syed “SumaiL” Hassan had sued the organization for fraud and deceit, although he reportedly lost his lawsuit at a jury trial in March 2024. From November 2022 to April 2023, the company lost close to half their sponsors, including a ten-year partnership with Monster Energy, and had two rounds of layoffs.

In an interview with Digiday after stepping down, LaPointe Jameson admitted: "nothing has been done perfectly, but I’m proud of where we’ve come, versus where we were." She denied that the controversy around Sakamaki had anything to do with her departure: "We — myself or EG — have still not received any actual complaints from Danny or his family around this. [...] I know people want an apology. But, as of now, I have nothing to apologize for."
