= Jemison (surname) =

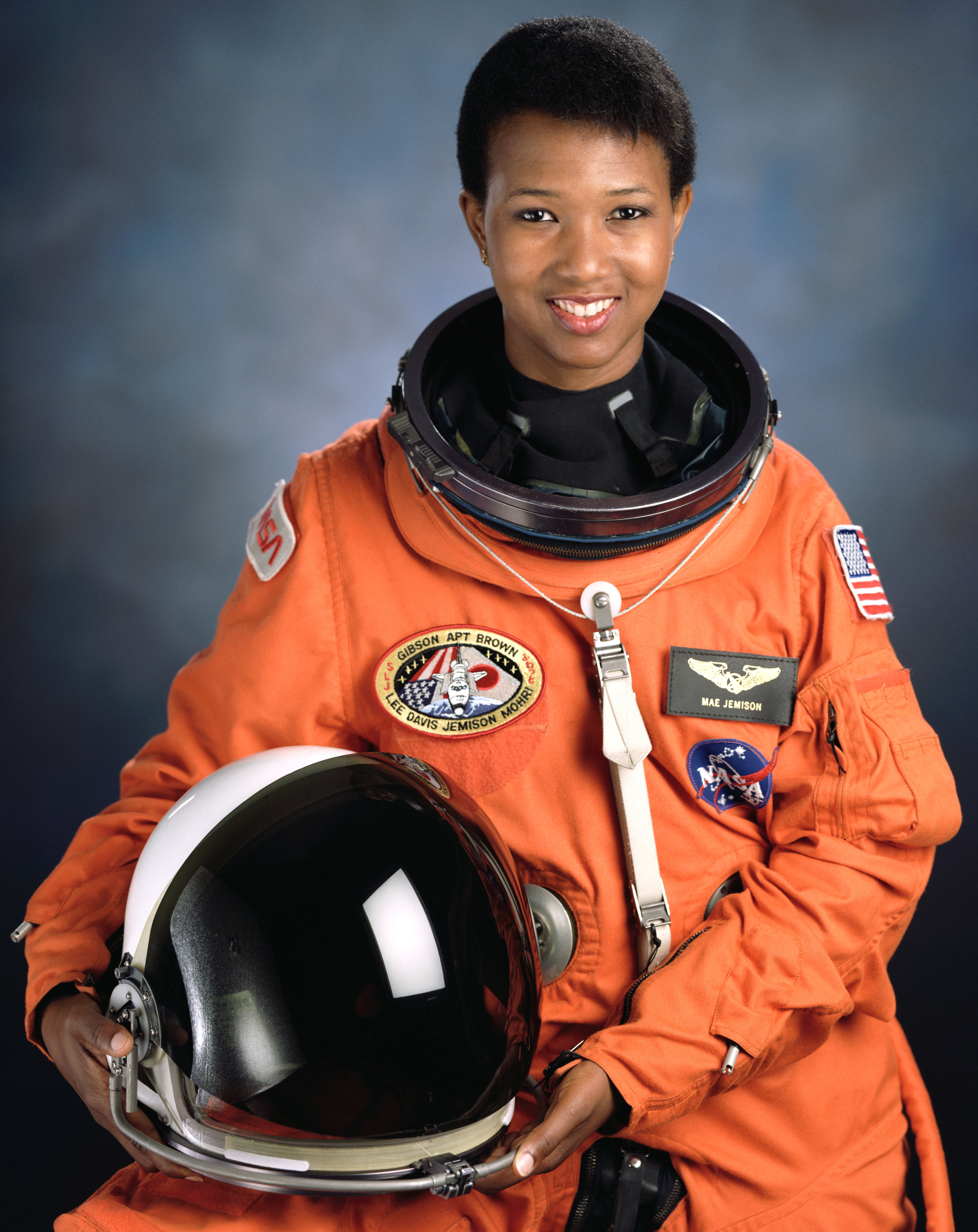
- Mae Jemison, first African American woman in space
- Language: English

Origin
- Derivation: James + son
- Meaning: "Son of James"
- Region of origin: The United Kingdom, Ireland

Jemison is an English surname. It is a patronymic formed from a diminutive of the name James.

Notable people with the surname include:

- Alice Lee Jemison (1901–1964), American political activist
- Caroline Helen Jemison (1829–1925), American white supremacist
- Charlie Jemison (born 1903), American baseball player
- Dick Jemison (1886–1965), American sportswriter
- Eddie Jemison (born 1963), American actor
- Edwin Francis Jemison (1844–1862), American Civil War soldier
- G. Peter Jemison (born 1945), Native American artist
- Julio Jemison (born 1994), Bahamian footballer
- Kelly Jemison, American geologist
- Mae Jemison (born 1956), American astronaut, engineer and physician
- Marty Jemison (born 1965), American cyclist
- Mary Jemison (1743–1833), Scots-Irish American frontierswoman
- Mike Jemison (born 1983), American football player
- Robert Jemison Jr. (1802–1871), American politician and entrepreneur
- Steffani Jemison (born 1981), American artist
- Thad Jemison (born 1961), American football player
- T. J. Jemison (1918–2013), American clergyman
- Trey Jemison (born 1999), American basketball player

== See also ==
- Jamison (surname)
- N. K. Jemisin (born 1972), American author
