= David Flavel Jamison =

American politician and judge (1810–1864)

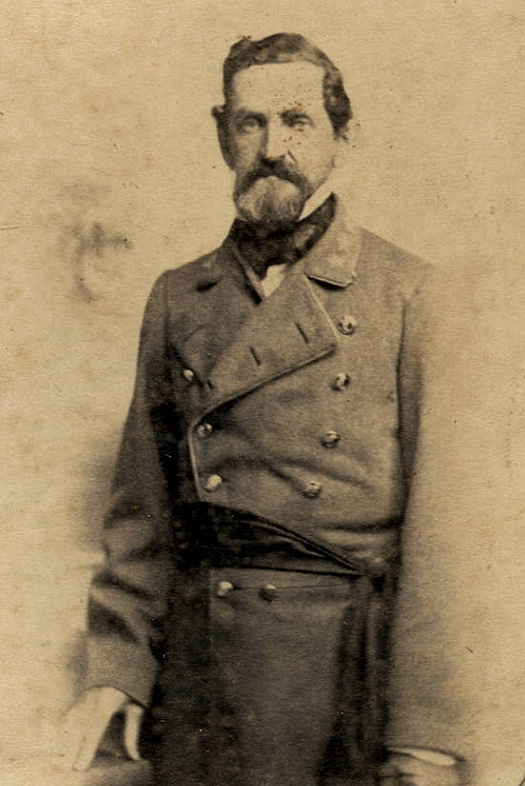
- Portrait of Jamison

Personal details
- Born: December 14, 1810 Orangeburg, South Carolina, U.S.
- Died: September 14, 1864 (aged 53) Charleston, South Carolina, U.S.
- Resting place: Presbyterian Cemetery; Orangeburg, South Carolina, U.S.
- Spouse: Elizabeth Rumph (m. 1832)
- Children: 3
- Education: South Carolina College
- Occupation: Politician; planter; judge; lawyer; writer

David Flavel Jamison (Note: Pronounced "Jemison", according to local historian Richard Rhame.) (December 14, 1810 – September 14, 1864) was an American politician, planter and judge from South Carolina.

== Early life ==
David Flavel Jamison was born on December 14, 1810, at White Hill in Orange Parish (now Orangeburg), South Carolina, to Elizabeth (née Rumph) and Van de Vastine Jamison. His maternal grandfather Jacob Rumph served in the Revolutionary War. His father was a physician. In 1820, Jamison attended Platt Springs Academy and studied classics there. In 1825, he joined the junior class of the South Carolina College. He did not graduate and left at the age of 17. In 1829, he studied law under Judge Glover and was admitted to the bar in 1831.

== Career ==
Jamison began practicing law in 1832. He retired from the law in 1834. He became a planter in 1832. He owned 2,000 acres (810 ha) and 70 slaves.

Jamison served in the South Carolina House of Representatives from 1838 to 1848. He introduced a bill to establish two military academies, the South Carolina Military Academy and The Citadel. This earned him the nickname, "the father of The Citadel". In 1842, he was named by Governor James H. Hammond as a member of the board of visitors of The Citadel. He was defeated in re-election to the state legislature and moved to the Barnwell district. He then served in the South Carolina legislature for that district.

In 1838, Jamison was commissioned colonel of the 31st Regiment of the South Carolina Cavalry. In 1841, he became brigadier general of the 2nd brigade of cavalry of the South Carolina militia. In 1850, he was a delegate to the Southern Convention in Nashville. Following the outbreak of the Civil War, he was a delegate and elected president of the 1860 South Carolina secession convention. The convention decreed an ordinance of secession on December 20, 1860. He was then appointed by Governor Francis Wilkinson Pickens as South Carolina Secretary of War. In 1864, he was appointed by the Confederate States government as a presiding judge and president of the military court. He presided over military trials in South Carolina, Georgia, and Florida.

Jamison wrote for the Southern Quarterly Review and other periodicals. He also wrote for the penitentiary system, including writings supporting slavery. Around 1855, he began writing The Life and Times of Bertrand Du Guesclin.

== Personal life ==
Jamison married Elizabeth Rumph, his cousin and the daughter of David Rumph, in December 1832. They had three children. His sister married judge Thomas W. Glover. In 1859, he moved from his home in Orangeburg near present-day Russell Street to a new home called Burwood in the Barnwell district (now part of Bamberg County) He moved to live closer to his friend, writer William Gilmore Simms.

Jamison died of yellow fever on September 14, 1864, in Charleston. He was buried at the old Presbyterian Cemetery on Doyle Street in Orangeburg. His grave was unmarked for almost 40 years. Alex S. Salley and his son raised funds in 1892 to add a marker to his grave.
