= James Jameson (priest) =

Irish Anglican cleric

James Jameson (1828–1899) was Archdeacon of Leighlin from 1881 until his death.

Hatchell was educated at Trinity College, Dublin. was ordained in 1854. He served curacies in Staplestown and Bagenalstown. He was the Incumbent at Painstown from 1859 to 1867 when he became the Vicar of Killeshin.

He died on 7 June 1899; and was succeeded at Killeshin by his son Canon Godfrey Haughton Jameson.
