= Samuel Halkett =

Scottish librarian (1814–1871)

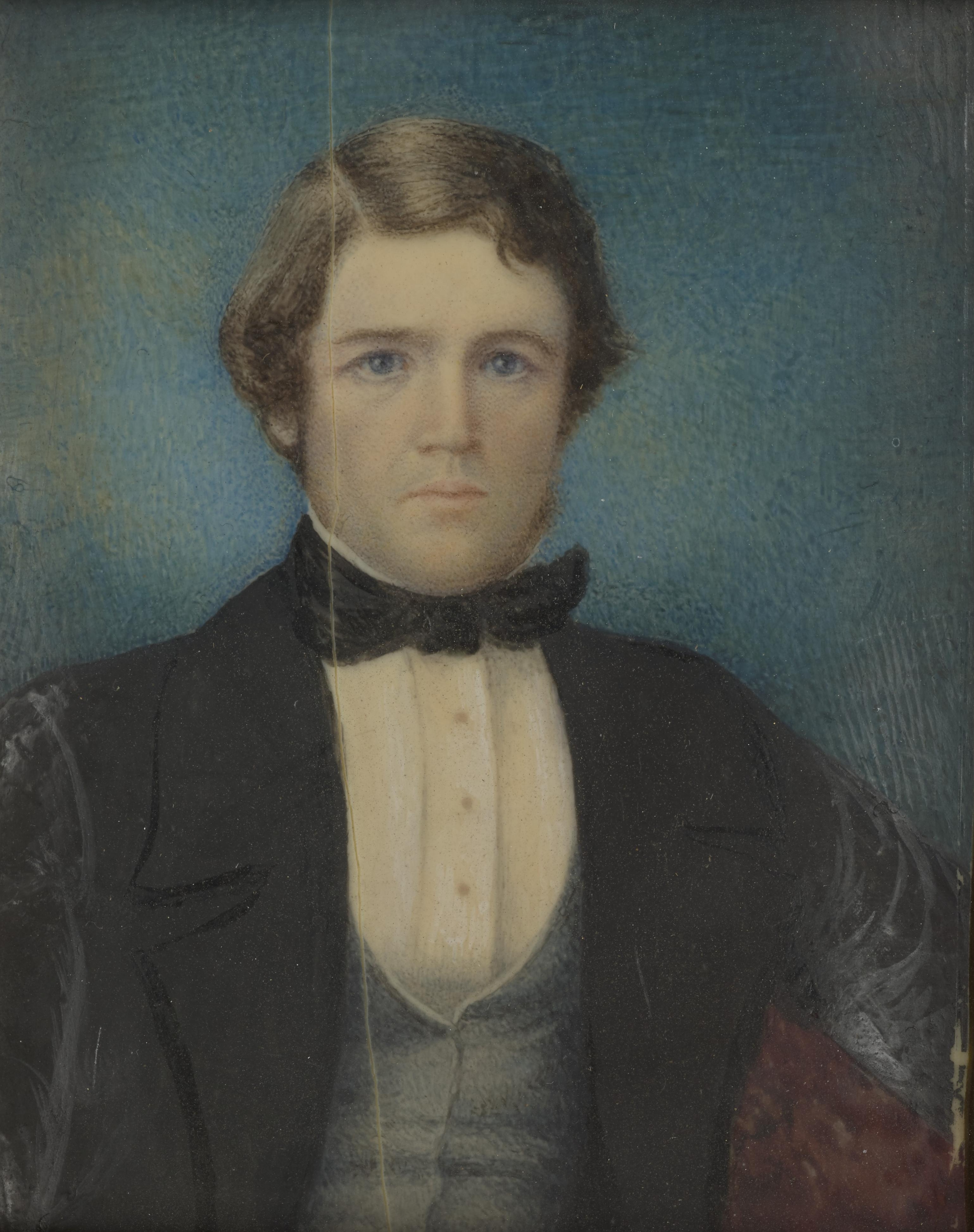
- Born: 1814
- Died: 1871 (aged 56–57)
- Occupation: Librarian

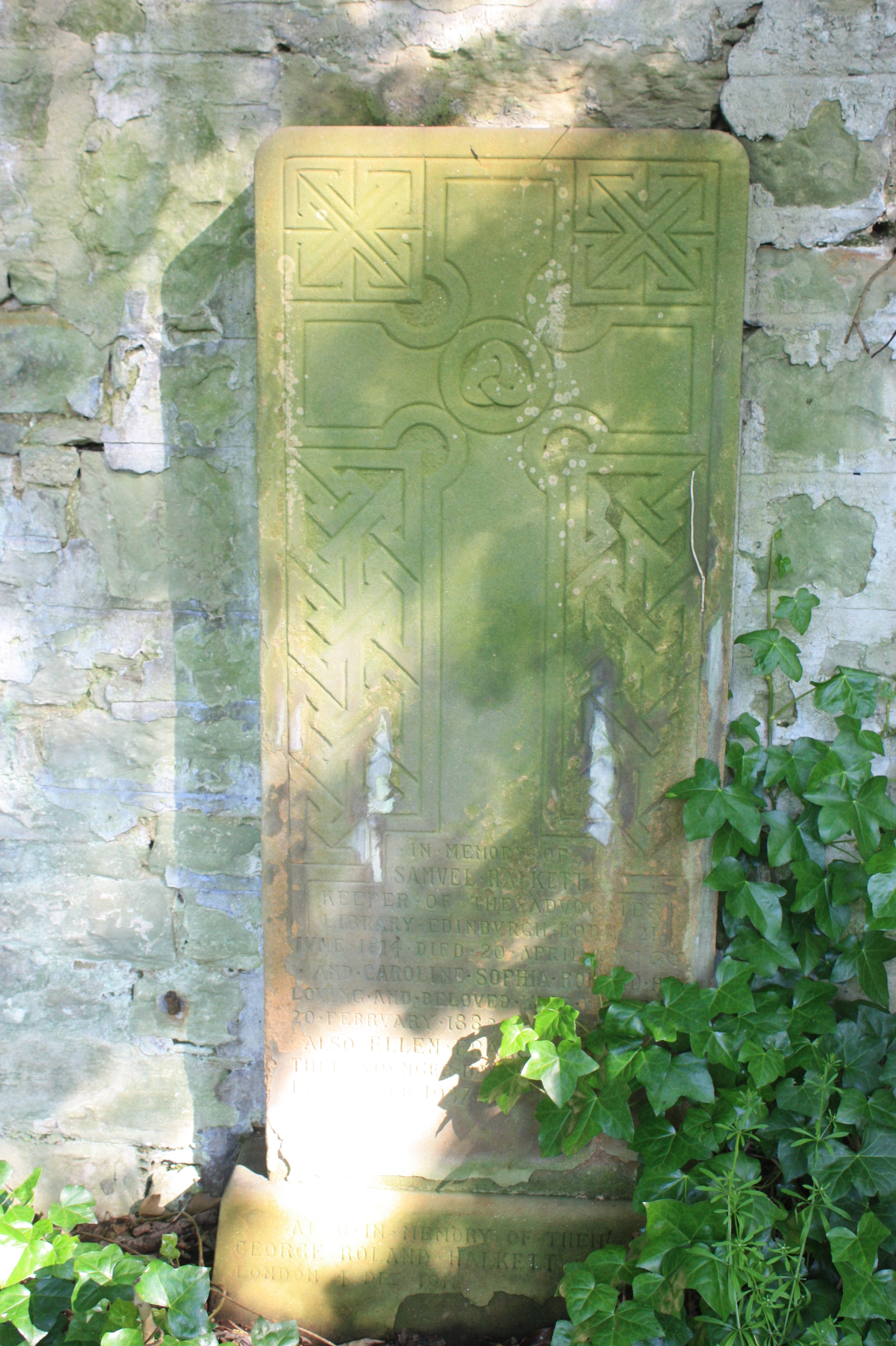
The grave of Samuel Halkett, Warriston Cemetery, Edinburgh

Samuel Halkett (21 June 1814 – 20 April 1871) was a Scottish librarian, now known for his work on anonymous publications. He built part of the initial collection and produced the first catalogue of the Advocates Library in Edinburgh.

== Biography ==
He was born on 21 June 1814, in the North Back of the Canongate, Edinburgh, where his father was in business as a brewer. He was educated at two private schools, and was apprenticed at the age of fourteen. For five years he was employed by the tailors and drapers Messrs. Marshall & Aitken, and afterwards by Messrs. Abernethy & Stewart, with whom he remained until he went into business for himself. His spare time was devoted to study, spoken of by Sir William Hamilton and others in supporting his successful candidature for the keepership of the Advocates Library, Edinburgh, in 1848.

In 1860 he was living at 35 East Claremont Street in Edinburgh's New Town.

Halkett died in April 1871, aged 57, leaving a widow (Caroline Sophia Roland, d. 1883) and four children. He is buried against the south wall of the main section of Warriston Cemetery, backing onto the former railway.

== Works ==
On being appointed librarian to the Faculty of Advocates he found the library without an alphabetical catalogue. He began a slip-catalogue, which formed the basis of the Catalogue of the Printed Books in the Library of the Faculty of Advocates, Edinburgh, 1863–79, 7 vols. The printing was begun in 1860, and was completed on a scale somewhat less extensive than at first planned. A report by Halkett on the state of the library in 1868 was appended to a memorandum signed by John Hill Burton on a proposed enlargement of the scope of the library (Edinburgh, 1868).

In 1856 Halkett wrote to Notes and Queries (2nd ser. i. 129) that he had been collecting materials for a dictionary of anonymous English works; on his death his materials were handed over to the Rev. John Laing, librarian of the New College, Edinburgh, who continued the work until his death in 1880. The book finally appeared, with additions, edited by Catherine Laing, as A Dictionary of the Anonymous and Pseudonymous Literature of Great Britain (Edinburgh, 1882–8, 4 vols.). Halkett also contributed some articles to Chambers's Cyclopædia.
