= Henry Jamieson =

English footballer

Personal information
- Full name: Harold John Jamieson
- Date of birth: 9 December 1908
- Place of birth: Wallsend, England
- Position: Inside forward

Senior career*
Years	Team	Apps	(Gls)
- Wallsend
1928–1929	Bradford City	2	(0)
- Crawcrook Albion
1929–1930	Crystal Palace	4	(0)
1930–1932	Gillingham	17	(1)
1932–1933	Wigan Athletic		
- * Club domestic league appearances and goals

Harold John Jamieson (born 9 December 1908) was an English professional footballer who played as an outside right.

== Career ==
Born in Wallsend, Jamieson signed for Bradford City in June 1928 from Wallsend, leaving the club in July 1929 to play for Crawcrook Albion. During his time with Bradford City he made two appearances in the Football League.

In November 1932, Jamieson was signed by Wigan Athletic, making 15 appearances for the club in the Cheshire League.

== Sources ==
- Frost, Terry (1988). Bradford City A Complete Record 1903-1988. Breedon Books Sport. ISBN 0-907969-38-0.
- Henry Jamieson at the English National Football Archive (subscription required)
