= Little Jamison, California =

Little Jamison
- Former settlement
- Location in California
- Coordinates: 39°44′35″N 120°42′05″W
- Country: United States
- State: California
- County: Plumas
- Elevation: 5,269 ft (1,606 m)

Little Jamison is a former settlement in Plumas County, California, United States. It lay at an elevation of 5269 feet (1606 m). Little Jamison is located on Little Jamison Creek, 6 miles (9.7 km) west of Clio. It still appeared on maps as of 1897.
