= Linda and Terry Jamison =

American identical twins and claimed psychics

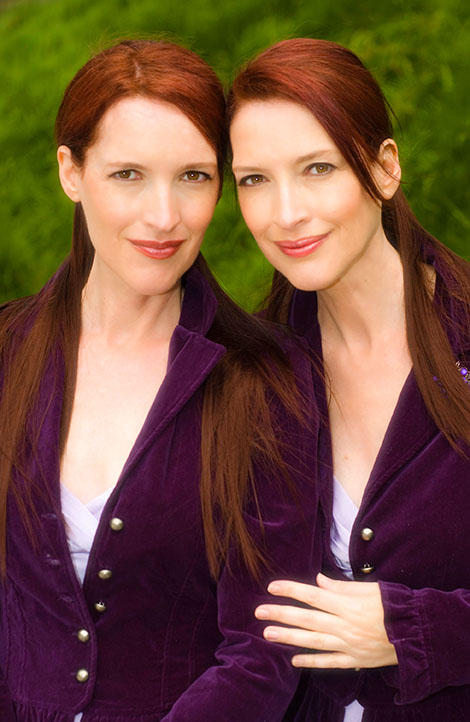
- Linda and Terry in 2007
- Born: January 12, 1955 (age 71); West Chester, Pennsylvania, U.S.
- Education: Temple University
- Occupation: Psychics
- Parent(s): Jane Jamison; Philip Jamison

Linda and Terry Jamison (born January 12, 1955) are American identical twins based in Los Angeles, California who claim to be psychics. The Jamisons' predictions have been featured in tabloid newspapers, and they have appeared in various media. They claim to have channeled the spirits of dead celebrities and predicted future events such as the September 11 attacks; however, critics have exposed the inaccuracy of many of their predictions.

== Education and background ==
The Jamisons grew up in West Chester, Pennsylvania. Their parents, Jane and Philip Jamison, were writers and painters. The Jamisons attended Temple University, and later worked as painters and performance artists. They had moved to New York City originally and landed comedy roles on Saturday Night Live, playing a two headed housewife, before later moving to California. They would also perform music, comedy, dance and acrobatics in New York.

== Career as "The Psychic Twins" ==
After leaving West Chester, the twins moved to Los Angeles and refocused their career as psychics, calling themselves "The Psychic Twins", reportedly charging more than $500 per person for psychic readings. They appeared in an episode of NBC's The Other Side in 1995 as their first psychic television appearance, with psychics interacting with guests. They have also appeared in ABC's Nightline Prime Beyond Belief Series, The View (ABC), Good Morning America (ABC), The Tyra Banks Show, the Oprah Winfrey Network and more where they did readings for guests. According to the Jamisons, they have predicted the future and contacted spirits of the dead, such as Lady Diana, Natalie Wood and Michael Jackson.

The Jamisons predictions have often been featured in tabloid newspapers such as The Sun, film and entertainment magazine The Hollywood Reporter, radio shows such as Beyond the Gate, Coast to Coast AM, Wings of Love, Colette Baron-Reid Show CBS, and more.

The Jamison twins maintain a YouTube channel on which YouTube stars Trisha Paytas and Shane Dawson have appeared.

== Critical analysis ==
The Jamisons widely claim to have predicted the September 11 attacks on the World Trade Center during a November 2, 1999 interview on the Art Bell radio show. However, according to show transcripts, their actual statement was: "We are seeing terrorist attacks on Federal Government, excuse me, federal buildings. Particularly South Carolina or Georgia, by July 2002 and also the New York Trade Center, the World Trade Center in 2002." The September 11 attack occurred in 2001, not 2002, and it was common knowledge that the buildings had been previously attacked by terrorists in the 1993 World Trade Center bombing, calling into question the Jamisons' claims.

Leon Jaroff, in Time, pointed out that the Jamison twins incorrectly predicted that Saddam Hussein would be killed by U.S. troops in early 2004, and that Pope John Paul II would die in June 2004 (he actually died in April 2005).

In September 2019, scientific skeptic Thomas Westbrook released a video dissecting the Twins's claims, including their most repeated claim of having predicted the September 11 attacks, saying that the twins demonstrate no paranormal abilities.

== Books ==
- Linda Jamison, Terry Jamison (2007). Separated at Earth: The Story of The Psychic Twins. Booklocker Inc. ISBN 978-1-60145-109-5.
- Linda Jamison, Terry Jamison (2011). Psychic Intelligence: Tune in and Discover the Power of Your Intuition. Grand Central Life and Style(Hachette). ISBN 978-0-446-56342-0.
- Linda Jamison, Terry Jamison (2017). You Can't Fix Stupid: Psychic Tips to Idiot-Proof Your Life. Kindle. ASIN B0723773YT.
