= David Jameson =

David Jameson may refer to:

- David Jameson (field hockey) (born 1984), Canadian field hockey player
- David Jameson (politician) (1723–1793), American merchant and politician

== See also ==
- David Jamieson (disambiguation)
- David Jamison (disambiguation)
