= Charles Alfred Tyrrell =

American physician (1843–1918)

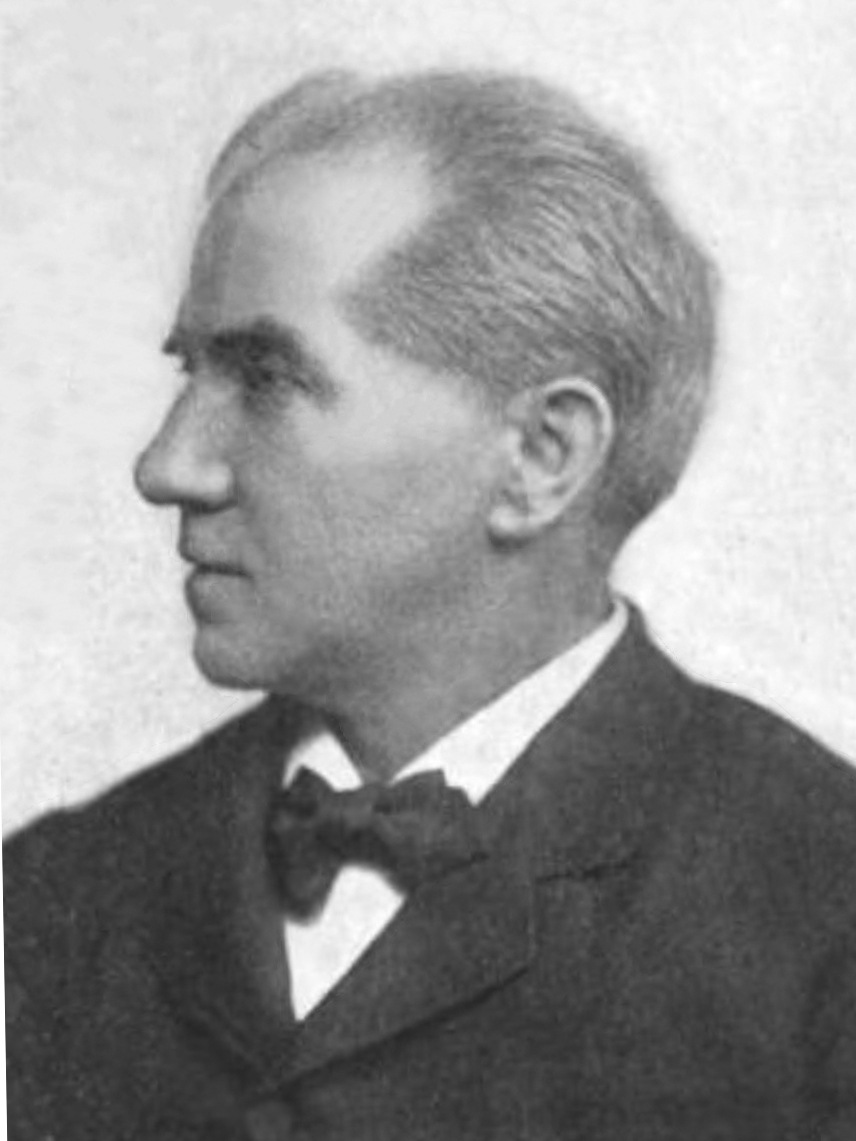
- Born: 1843; England
- Died: July 2, 1918 (aged 75); New York, New York, US

Charles Alfred Tyrrell (1843 – July 2, 1918) was a promoter of medical devices, most notably an enema appliance. He was also author of tracts promoting the use of his device for colon cleansing as therapy for detoxification pursuant to a theory of auto-intoxication.

Tyrrell's claim that his J. B. L. Cascade device could cure all disease was dismissed by medical experts as quackery.

== Early life and family ==
Tyrrell was born in England and travelled to India, China, South Africa, New Zealand, and Australia prior to emigrating to New York City in 1889. In his will dated 2 August 1915 Tyrrell said he had married "Eliza or Lillie" Glaister in Australia about thirty years previously. He said that she had disappeared and that three years later he married (his current wife) Emma W. But in 1914 he had learned that Eliza was still alive, and he made arrangements for her support. By his first marriage he had a son, Ernest Alfred Tyrrell, who was born 1881.

== Education ==
Having called himself "Professor" and an M.D. for years, Tyrrell finally got an M.D. degree in 1900 at age 57 from the Eclectic Medical College of New York. Eclectic medicine was primarily concerned with herbal medicine.

== Career ==
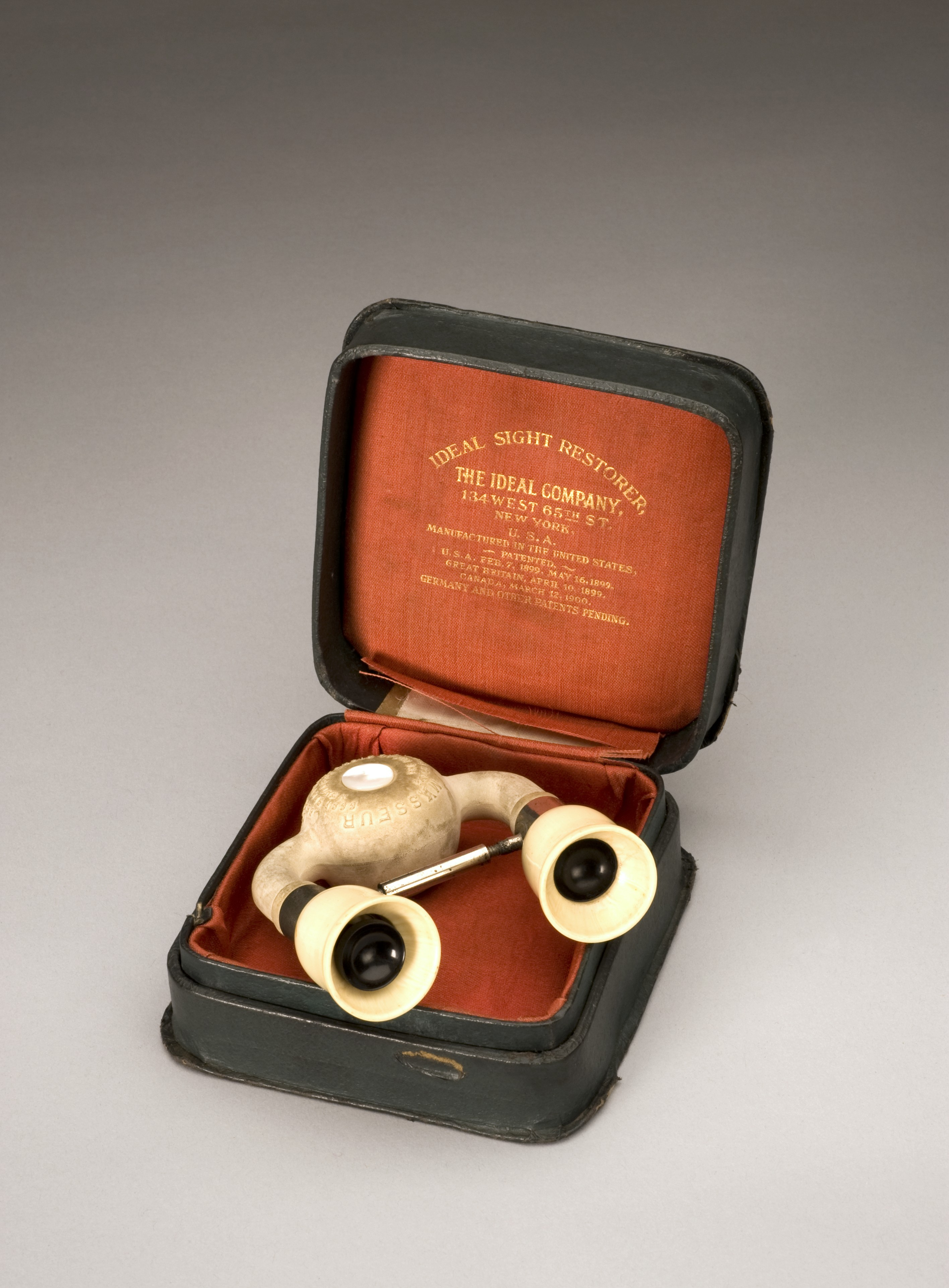
Ideal Sight Restorer

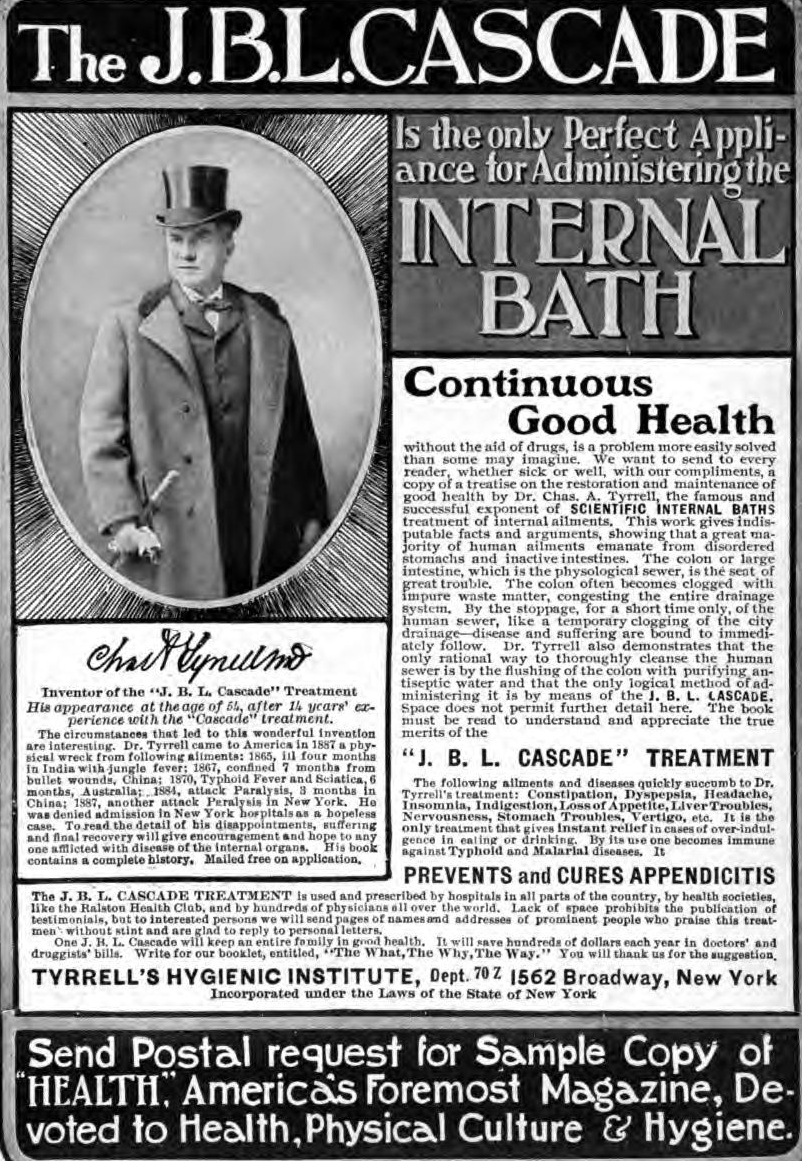
J. B. L. Casade advert, 1905

Tyrrell established the Tyrrell Hygienic Institute in New York City to promote his various books and products. His wife Emma was the corporate secretary. Tyrrell died at his home in Manhattan on July 2, 1918. Despite this, the Institute seems to have existed at least until the late 1930s.

=== Ideal Sight Restorer ===
Tyrrell sold a device named the "Ideal Sight Restorer". This was "a piece of tubing with a rubber bulb attached for the purpose of producing a partial vacuum over the eyeballs". The device was reviewed by the AMA and criticized as "pseudomedical claptrap"; the manufacturer, Ideal Company, moved to England and was renamed "Neu-Vita Hygienic Institute"—to avoid prosecution.

=== J. B. L. Cascade ===
Tyrrell promoted an enema appliance he called the "J. B. L. Cascade". "J.B.L." stood for "Joy, Beauty, Life". This was his primary money-maker. He accessorized the product, selling "Rectal Soap" and a fluid, "J. B. L. Antiseptic Tonic", a patent medicine, to be used with it. The J. B. L. Casade consisted of a rubber bag which was filled with the "J. B. L. Antiseptic Tonic" which was inserted into the anus. The weight of the body would force the tonic into the rectum. An investigation by the American Medical Association (AMA) found that Henry M. Guild invented the device and patented it in 1903, and assigned his patents to Tyrrell. Tyrrell incorrectly claimed to be the inventor of the device.

Tyrrell advertised the device as curing practically all diseases including appendicitis, dysmenorrhea, obesity, piles, gastritis, hydrocele, typhoid fever, scarlet fever, malaria, paralysis and rheumatism. However, his claims had no medical basis. In 1922, it was noted that "the facts are it will neither prevent nor cure disease, and it is not endorsed by leading physicians."

=== Publications ===
In 1894 Tyrrell wrote The Royal Road to Health, which continued through more than 260 editions, and which remains available today through online booksellers and can be downloaded at archive.org; by 1943 authorship was claimed by E. J. Borzilleri, who was associated with Tyrrell's Hygienic Institute. The book is designed to promote Tyrrell's enema device.

At his Hygienic Institute, Tyrrell also published a periodical, Health: A Home Magazine Devoted to Physical Culture and Hygiene. The magazine was opposed to conventional medical treatment and promoted orthopathy, physical culture and pseudoscientific dieting ideas. The AMA criticized it as a "fad magazine" which advertised "pseudo-medical" products. Tyrrell's Institute published similar works by other authors, such as Alcinous Burton Jamison's Intestinal Ills.

== Criticisms ==
=== American Medical Association ===
The American Medical Association published critiques and exposes of Tyrrell in its Journal of the American Medical Association. The AMA leveled many criticisms of Tyrrell's product and promotion including the following:

1. The advertising for the J. B. L. Cascade product was one of "deceit, misrepresentation, and quackery"
2. The underlying theory—that there is only one cause for disease and that cause is autointoxication resulting from intestinal obstruction – is "false" and "absurd"
3. The product itself may be dangerous.
4. The advice to take rectal enemas both in times of sickness and in health is "mischievous". In respect of Tyrrell's publication Health, the AMA complained that its advertising section "reeked with frauds".

=== Modern criticism ===
Tyrrell's Ideal Sight Restorer was criticized in a 1986 article in the Ophthalmology journal, which noted that "although his fraudulent activities and deceptive advertising practices were described on several occasions in the Journal of the American Medical Association, Dr. Tyrrell persisted in his enterprises until he died in 1918."

Tyrrell was cited as an "exemplary proponent" of the theory of auto-intoxication in a 1997 article by Edzard Ernst in the Journal of Clinical Gastroenterology, which likewise characterized Tyrrell as a "quack".

== Selected publications ==
- Health: A Home Magazine Devoted to Physical Culture and Hygiene (1904–1905)
- The Royal Road to Health: Or, The Secret of Health Without Drugs (1920)

== Bibliography ==
- Tyrrell, Charles Alfred. The Royal Road to Health Via the J.B.L Cascade Treatment: A Treatise on Hygiene. 1894.
- Whorton, James C. Inner Hygiene: Constipation and the Pursuit of Health in Modern Society. Oxford University Press US. (2000)
