= James L. Jamison =

American politician

South Carolina House of Representatives

South Carolina Senate
- In office 1870–1872

Personal details
- Died: July 2, 1873
- Party: Republican

James L. Jamison (died July 2, 1873) was a farmer, teacher, businessman, and state legislator in South Carolina.

Jamison sat in the South Carolina Senate representing Orangeburg during the Reconstruction era. He was a Republican elected to terms in 1870 and 1872. He was African American. He was a teacher of freedmen. In 1878, after Democrats regained control state government in South Carolina, he was accused of receiving a payoff in lieu of a debt he was owed from an insolvent bank propped up by legislators who were paid off.

== See also ==
- African American officeholders from the end of the Civil War until before 1900
