= Nathan Jameson =

English footballer

Personal information
- Full name: Nathan Jameson
- Date of birth: 20 March 1985
- Place of birth: Middlesbrough, England
- Height: 5 ft 11 in (1.80 m)
- Positions: Midfielder; forward

Senior career*
Years	Team	Apps	(Gls)
200?–2003	Whinney Banks		
2003–2005	Walsall	0	(0)
2005	→ Bromsgrove Rovers (loan)	4	(0)
2005	Durham City	2	(0)
2005–2006	Darlington	5	(0)
2006	Dunston Federation		(1)
2006–2008	Billingham Town		
2008	Glenavon		
2008–2013	Billingham Synthonia	115	(25)
2013	Consett		
2013–2014	Shildon		
2014	Guisborough Town		
2014–	Billingham Synthonia		
- * Club domestic league appearances and goals

Nathan Jameson (born 20 March 1985) is an English footballer who played in the Football League for Darlington. He began his senior career with Walsall, but never played for their first team. He also played in the Irish Premier League for Glenavon and for a number of non-league clubs, mainly in his native north-east of England. A midfielder in the early part of his career, he has also played as a forward.

== Football career ==
Jameson was born in Middlesbrough, and as a youngster played for Whinney Banks in the Teesside League. He joined Football League First Division club Walsall in the 2003 close season, and signed a professional contract a year later. He was twice named as a substitute for Walsall's first team, once when manager Paul Merson fielded a team of reserves in a League Cup match, and once for a league match against Blackpool, but was not used. He went on loan to Southern League club Bromsgrove Rovers in February 2005, but was reported to be homesick and his contract was ended by mutual consent in March.

He returned to the north-east where he played twice for Northern League club Durham City, before earning himself a monthly contract with League Two club Darlington, to give them further depth in midfield. He made his debut as a last-minute substitute as Darlington were eliminated from the League Cup by local rivals Hartlepool United, and his first Football League appearance, again off the bench, in the next match, a 4–4 draw away at Chester City. He made four more substitute appearances before his first start, which was on 22 October as Darlington beat Cheltenham Town 3–1. Within days, he had broken a metatarsal bone and was expected to be out for several weeks, and he was released in January.

Jameson then played in the Northern League for Dunston and Billingham Town, before joining Irish League club Glenavon in January 2008. He returned to the Northern League in August 2008 with Billingham Synthonia, where he spent five seasons, then had short spells with Consett, Shildon and Guisborough Town, before returning to Billingham Synthonia in September 2014.
