= Joan Jameson =

Irish artist, known for her still life, figure and landscape painting

- Born: Joan Moira Maud Musgrave; 4 October 1892; Tourin, Cappoquin, County Waterford, Ireland
- Died: 22 September 1953 (aged 60); Ardmore, County Waterford
- Education: Académie Julian
- Known for: still-life, figures and landscape painting
- Spouse: Tom Jameson

Joan Jameson (4 October 1892 – 22 September 1953) was an Irish artist, known for paintings of still-life, figures and landscapes.

== Life ==
Joan Jameson was born Joan Moira Maud, on 4 October 1892, in London. She was the eldest of the two daughters of Sir Richard John Musgrave, 5th Baronet, and Jesse Sophia. Her mother was the daughter of Robert Dunsmuir. Jameson was educated at home and in Paris, studying art at the Académie Julian.

On 11 June 1920, she married Tom Jameson of Rock House, Ardmore, County Waterford. The couple lived in London until 1929, and on the death of Sir Richard, they returned to Tourin, Waterford. Jameson would make regular visits to London, as it offered a larger choice of exhibiting venues. In the 1950s, the couple moved from Tourin to the Rock House. Jameson was part of a large social circle, including her close acquaintances fellow artist Norah McGuinness and writer Molly Keane, who visited her in Waterford.

Jameson had two sons, William Shane Musgrave and Julian Richard Musgrave. She died on 22 September 1953, and is buried at Ardmore. The sculptor Séamus Murphy carved her headstone, which featured a palette and brushes.

== Artistic career ==
Jameson was exhibited at three London galleries: Goupil & Cie, The Redfern Gallery, and the Leicester Galleries. These included solo shows in 1933 and 1937, when sixty of her paintings were shown. In Dublin, she exhibited with the Society of Dublin Painters from 1938 to 1948. She was a prolific artist, and considered talented, receiving critical attention from 1943. Around this time she was shown at the Irish Exhibition of Living Art from 1943 to 1953. Edward Sheehy, a critic who wrote for The Dublin Magazine, noted that she had "courage and distinction." Eric Newton selected some of her work for the Living Art exhibition in 1951. She was featured in the 1953 Contemporary Irish Art Exhibition at Aberystwyth, Wales. A retrospective of her work was shown at the Irish Exhibition of Living Art in 1954, with artworks loaned by her husband and friends. Her work was exhibited in a 1989 retrospective at the Crawford Art Gallery, and at the Royal Hibernian Academy.
