= Philip Jamison =

American artist (1925–2021)

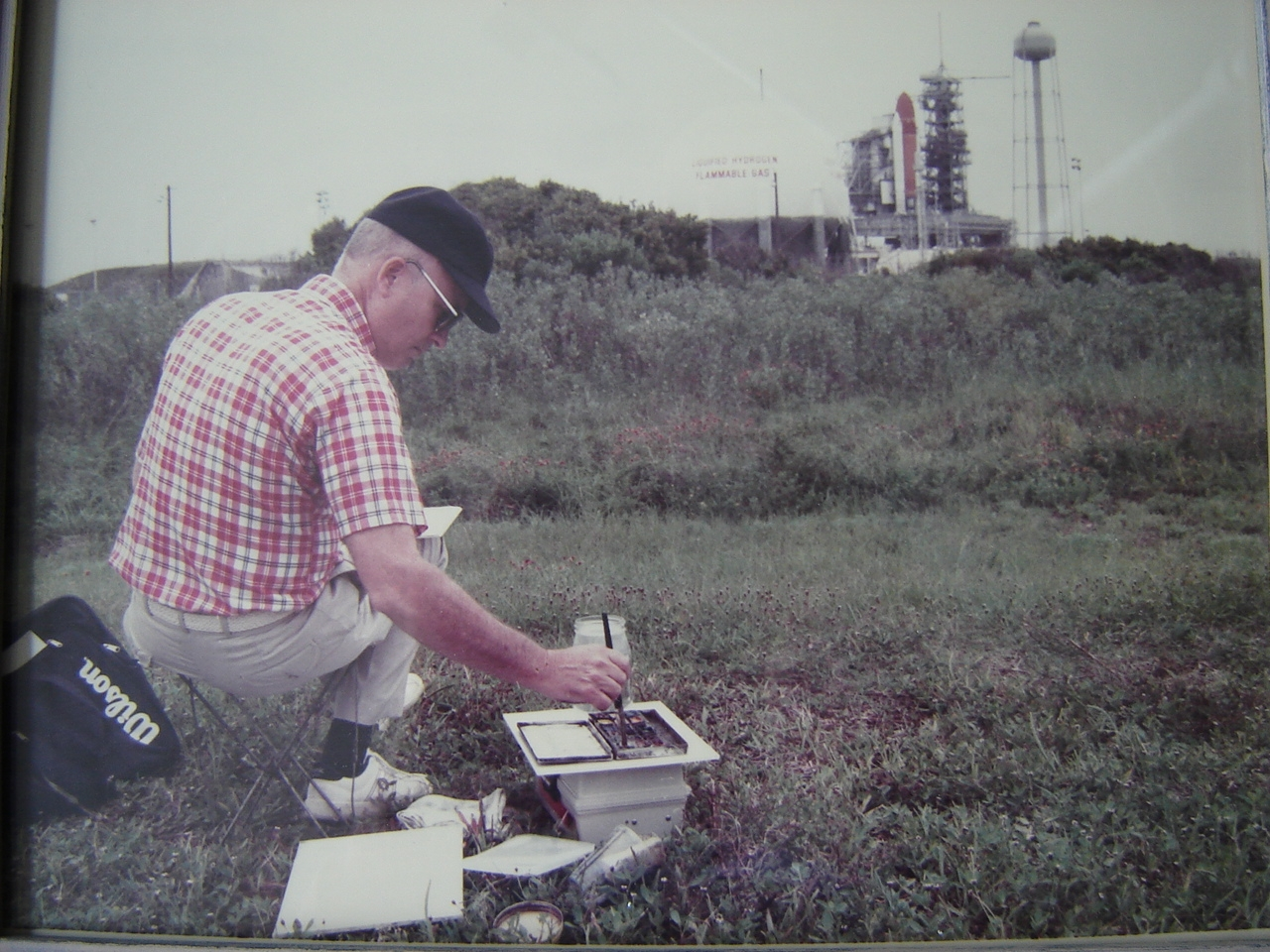
- American watercolorist
- Born: July 3, 1925; Philadelphia, Pennsylvania, U.S.
- Died: September 3, 2021 (aged 96); West Chester, Pennsylvania, U.S.
- Occupation: Artist
- Spouse: Jane Gray (m. 1950)
- Children: 3; including Linda and Terry

Philip Jamison (July 3, 1925 – September 3, 2021) was an American artist working primarily with watercolor as a medium. Typical scenes are landscapes, seascapes, interiors and flower arrangements.

== Biography ==
Jamison was born in 1925 in Philadelphia, Pennsylvania, moving to West Chester, Pennsylvania, with his mother "Daisy" before the first grade, where she raised him as a single parent. When Jamison completed high school in 1943, he was drafted into the United States Navy. After two and half years of service, he attended college under the G.I. Bill. Jamison graduated from the Philadelphia Museum School of Industrial Art (later known as the University of the Arts) in 1950. This is where he reconnected with childhood friend Jane Gray. They were married in 1950. Jamison had three children, a son Philip III, who resides in West Chester, and identical twin daughters, Linda and Terry Jamison. They are also artists, and well known as claimed psychics.

He died in West Chester, Pennsylvania, in September 2021, at the age of 96.

== Career ==
Jamison's work has been widely exhibited in museums and galleries, including the Metropolitan Museum of Art, and are included in the permanent collections of the Pennsylvania Academy of the Fine Arts, the Boston Museum of Fine Arts, the Delaware Art Museum, the National Air and Space Museum, etc. and in numerous private collections. He was elected a member of the National Academy of Design in 1970 and has been a member of the American Watercolor Society since 1957. He exhibited with The Hirschl & Adler Galleries in New York City for 25 years, including nine one-man shows. In 1975, he was selected by NASA to paint his impressions of the Apollo–Soyuz Test Project space launch in Cape Canaveral, Florida.

He was represented from 1958 to 1980 by The Hirschl & Adler Galleries in New York City and for over 20 years by Sessler's in Philadelphia. Jamison is the author of two books on the techniques of watercolor painting, written in 1980 and 1987.

Philip Jamison has displayed a one-man show at the Chester County Art Association, January 2011 to March 2011, entitled "Philip Jamison: Watercolors." These paintings were created during Jamison's summers in Maine.

== Books ==
=== Capturing Nature in Watercolor ===
His first book, Capturing Nature in Watercolor (Watson-Guptill, 1980), contains an introduction to his personal history and philosophy of art. Jamison also elaborates on self-expression, interior design, illustration, and discovering watercolor painting as his true medium. Jamison also recalls his art training, and salutes the artists that influenced him, including Winslow Homer, Edward Hopper, Odilon Redon, Andrew Wyeth and especially watercolorists W. Emerton Heitland, who was his teacher and mentor in high school.

=== Making Your Paintings Work ===
The second book, Making Your Paintings Work (Watson-Guptill, 1987), provides more details on his paintings and pencil drawings.

== Bibliography ==
- Philip Jamison, Capturing Nature in Watercolor, (Watson-Guptill, January 1, 1980) ISBN 0823005585
- Philip Jamison, Making Your Paintings Work, (Watson-Guptill, October 1, 1987) ISBN 0823029980

== See also ==
- Linda and Terry Jamison
