= Richard Jameson =

Richard Jameson may refer to:

- Richard Willis Jameson (1851–1899), Canadian politician
- Richard Jameson (loyalist) (1953–2000), Northern Irish businessman and loyalist
