= Stephen Jameson =

Stephen Jameson may refer to:

- A singer with the British group The Javells
- A character in The Tomorrow People
