= William Jameson =

William Jameson may refer to:

- William Jameson (religious controversialist) (fl. 1689–1720), Scottish teacher and religious controversialist
- William Jameson (botanist, born 1796) (1796–1873), Scottish-Ecuadorian botanist
- William Jameson (botanist, born 1815) (1815–1882), Scottish botanist and doctor in India
- William James Jameson (1898–1990), United States federal judge
- William Jameson, member of the Jameson whiskey dynasty and manager of the Marrowbone Lane Distillery
