= Robert Jameson (disambiguation) =

Robert Jameson (1774–1854) was a naturalist and mineralogist.

Robert Jameson may also refer to:

- Robert Jameson (shipowner) (d. 1608) Scottish merchant
- Bobby Jameson (1945–2015), American singer and songwriter
- Robert Sympson Jameson (1796–1854), Canadian lawyer, judge and political figure
- Robert William Jameson (1805–1868), politician, playwright and newspaper editor

== See also ==
- Robert Jamieson (disambiguation)
