= Tom Jameson =

Irish first-class cricketer (1892–1965)

Personal information
- Full name: Thomas Ormsby Jameson
- Born: 4 April 1892; Clonsilla, Ireland
- Died: 6 February 1965 (aged 72); Dún Laoghaire, Leinster, Ireland
- Batting: Right-handed
- Bowling: Leg spin
- Relatives: William Hone (grandfather)

Domestic team information
- Years: Team
- 1919–1930: Marylebone Cricket Club
- 1919–1932: Hampshire
- 1926–1928: Ireland

Career statistics
Competition	First-class
Matches	124
Runs scored	4,675
Batting average	26.56
100s/50s	5/27
Top score	133
Balls bowled	12,559
Wickets	252
Bowling average	24.03
5 wickets in innings	11
10 wickets in match	2
Best bowling	7/92
Catches/stumpings	102/–
Medal record
Men's squash
British Amateur Championships
Gold medal – first place	1922/1923	singles
Gold medal – first place	1923/1924	singles
- Source: Cricinfo, 15 November 2022

Thomas Ormsby Jameson (4 April 1892 — 6 February 1965) was an Irish first-class cricketer and a soldier in the British Army. As a cricketer, he made 124 appearances in first-class cricket as an all-rounder. He was mostly associated with the British Army cricket team, Hampshire County Cricket Club, and the Marylebone Cricket Club, though he also represented Ireland twice. In first-class cricket, he scored nearly 4,700 runs and took over 250 wickets. In the British Army, he was an officer in the Rifle Brigade, with which he served in the first part of the First World War, before serving with the Royal West African Frontier Force. A major shareholder in Jameson Irish Whiskey, he was descended from its founder John Jameson.

== Early life and education ==
Jameson was descended from John Jameson, a Scotsman who founded the Jameson Whiskey Distillery in Dublin. He was born to James Ormsby Jameson and Maria Hone in Clonsilla in April 1892; his grandfather was the cricketer William Hone. He began his education in England at Hazelwood School, where his affinity for sports began. He then proceeded to Harrow School, playing cricket for the school and taking part in the famous Fowler's match (named for his fellow Irish compatriot Robert St Leger Fowler) against Eton in 1910. An all-round sportsman, he also represented Harrow in rackets and fives.

== Military career ==
After completing his education, Jameson joined the British Army and was commissioned into the Rifle Brigade as a second lieutenant on probation in November 1912, serving in Ireland, with him being confirmed in the rank in April 1914. He served in the First World War with the 3rd Battalion on the Western Front, with Jameson departing for France in September 1914 on board the SS Lake Michigan from Southampton. Two months later, he was promoted to lieutenant, with Jameson returning to England toward the end of 1915. The following year he was posted to the 6th Reserve Battalion, based on the Isle of Sheppey. Promoted to captain in March 1917, he was seconded to the Colonial Office in September 1917 and served in West Africa with the West African Frontier Force. Following the end of the war in November 1919, Jameson returned from West Africa and was restored to the Rifle Brigade February 1920. He spent three years from 1919 to 1922 serving in Ireland, before joining the 21st (County of London) Battalion as an adjutant from March 1923 to October 1924, after which he left the military and returned to Ireland to run the family farm at Cappoquin.

== Sporting career ==
=== Cricket ===
==== During military service ====
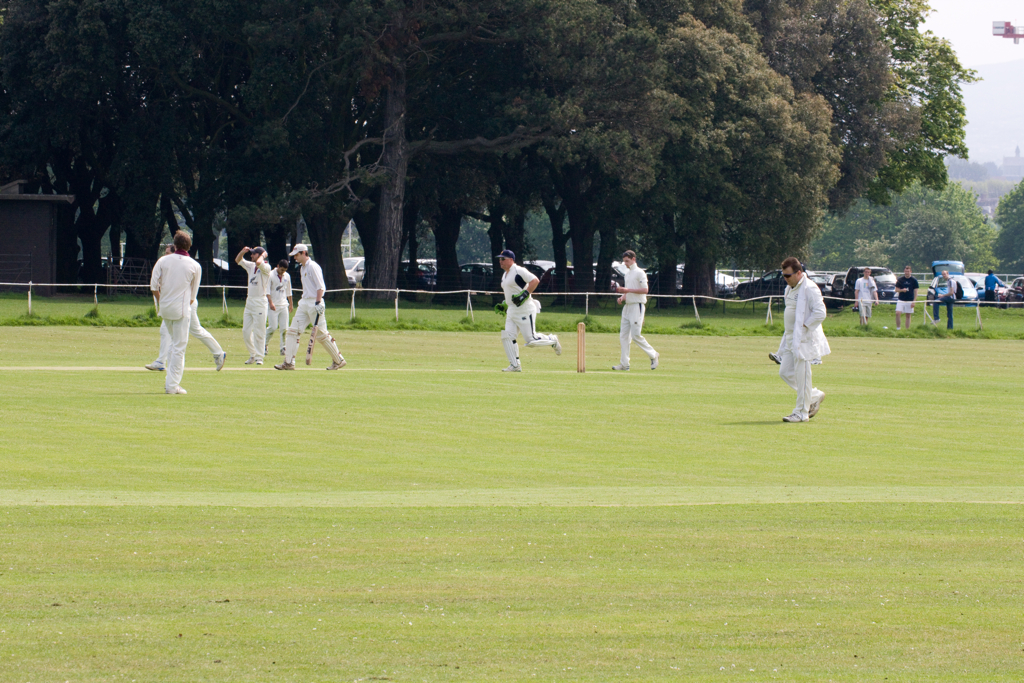
Jameson began playing club cricket for Phoenix based at Phoenix Park (pictured) in Dublin

Prior to joining the army, Jameson played club cricket in Ireland for both Phoenix and the nomadic Na Shuler. Following the First World War, he made his debut in first-class cricket for the Marylebone Cricket Club (MCC) against Oxford University at Lord's in June 1919. The following month, he made his debut for Hampshire against Yorkshire at Dewsbury in the County Championship, with him making a further eight appearances for Hampshire that season. He also played for the South against an Australian Imperial Forces team. He began playing first-class cricket for armed services teams in 1920, making two appearances for the British Army cricket team against the MCC and Cambridge University, in addition to playing for the Combined Services cricket team against the Gentlemen of England; for the Army against the MCC, he took his maiden five wicket haul with figures of 5 for 22 in the MCC second innings, helping guide the Army to an innings victory. Jameson scored his maiden first-class century in 1921, making 119 for the Army against the Royal Navy at Lord's. In the same season he played a handful of services matches, including for the Combined Services against the touring Australians, alongside two appearances for Hampshire and the MCC. Notably for Hampshire against Surrey, he took figures of 6 for 81 in Surrey's first innings and scored an aggressive 84 in Hampshire's first innings. At the end of the season, he played for the Gentlemen in the Gentlemen v Players fixture at The Oval.

Jameson's 1922 season closely matched 1921 in terms of the first-class fixtures in which he participated in. He had notable all-round performance during his first match of the 1922 season, when playing for the Combined Services against Essex he made two half centuries (54 and 63) and took 5 for 61. Having been elected a Free Forester in 1920, he played for them in 1922 against Oxford University. At the end of the season, he once again featured in the Gentlemen v Players fixture at The Oval. Jameson featured more extensively for Hampshire in 1923, making eight first-class appearances, seven of which came in the County Championship; this uptake in county fixtures coincided with his transfer from the Rifle Brigade to the 21st (County of London) Battalion. Although he had transferred regiments, he continued to play services cricket, making three appearances for the Army. He also made three appearances for the MCC, including captaining them in a weather-affected match against the touring West Indians. Although he featured just once for Hampshire in 1924, Jameson made three final appearances for the Army, made a final appearance for the Combined Services against the touring South Africans, and played twice for the MCC. For the Army, he had made fourteen appearances, scoring 715 runs at an average of 32.50; as a bowler, he took 47 wickets at a bowling average of 17.61.

==== Post-military service ====
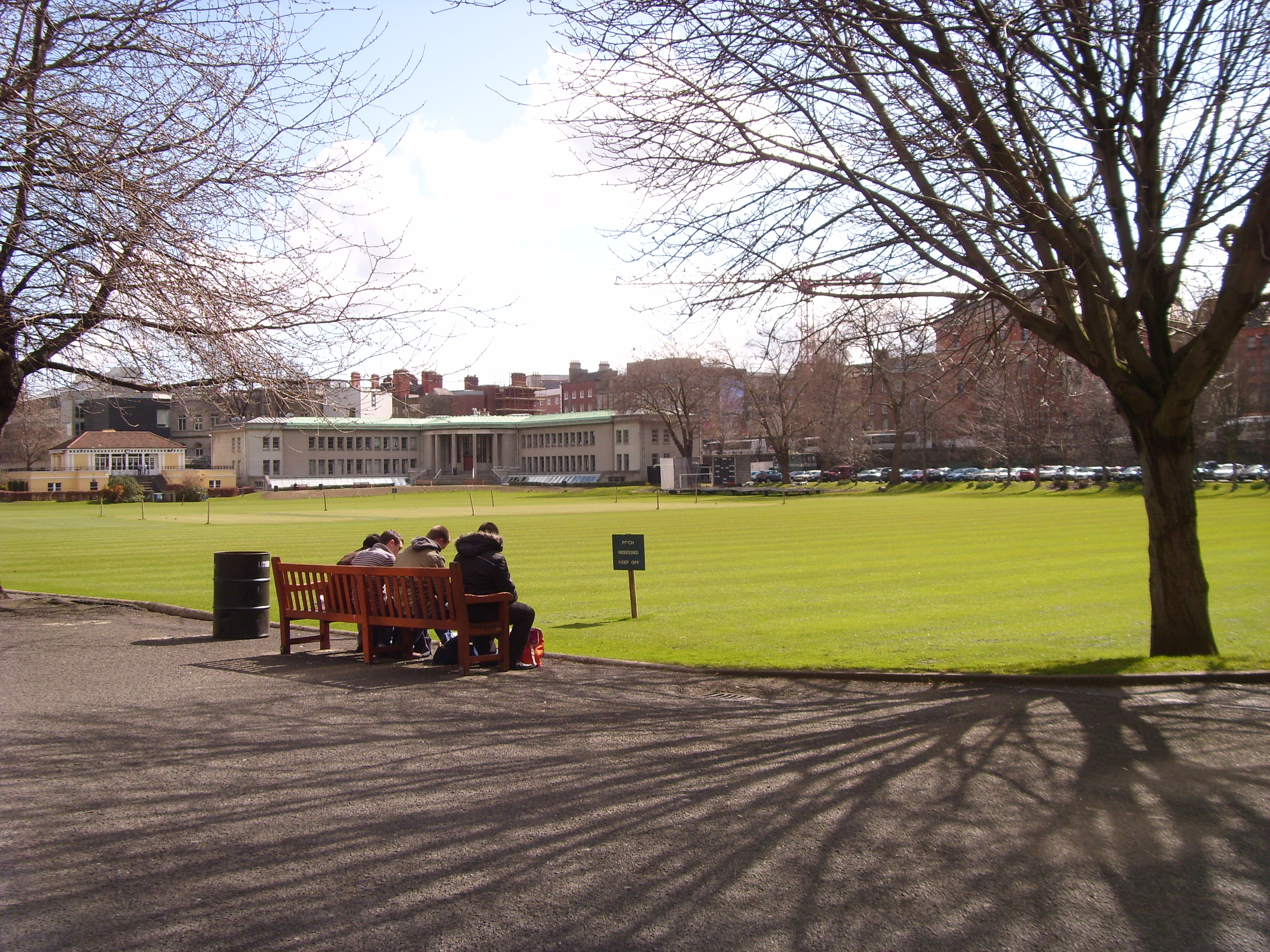
Jameson played for Ireland in their famous win against the West Indians at College Park, Dublin (pictured) in 1928

The month after his military career came to an end, Jameson was selected to tour South Africa with Solomon Joel's personal eleven, which was captained by Lionel Tennyson, Jameson's captain at Hampshire. He played in ten first-class matches on the tour, including playing three times against South Africa. He had success on the tour against Rhodesia, scoring 90 not out from number nine, and against Orange Free State he made 133, which was to be the highest first-class score of his career. His 430 first-class runs at an average of 39.09 were the second-best on the tour. Despite returning to Ireland to manage his family's farm, Jameson still made himself available to play for Hampshire. During the 1925 season, he made thirteen appearances in the County Championship, in addition to playing for the Gentlemen in the Gentlemen v Players fixture and for Lionel Tennyson's personal team against the personal team of Arthur Gilligan. In terms of runs scored, the 1925 season was to be Jameson's most successful, with 599 runs at an average of 26.04. In an innings victory over Warwickshire, he scored 103 batting at number eight. He also took 28 wickets during the season, which included his career-best figures of 7 for 92 against a strong Lancashire batting lineup.

During the winter which proceeded the 1925 season, Jameson toured the West Indies with an MCC team captained by Freddie Calthorpe. He made eleven first-class appearances during the tour, including playing in three matches against the West Indies, then just two years away from Test status. Jameson had success on the tour, scoring 536 runs at an average of 41.23, with one century (110) against Jamaica at Kingston. He also made 98 against the West Indies at Bridgetown, sharing in a partnership of 218 for the sixth wicket with Wally Hammond, which the pair made in just over two and a half hours. He played little for Hampshire the following season, making just three appearances in the County Championship; against Somerset, he made an unbeaten 105 to help Hampshire to draw a match they had seemed certain to lose. During the season he made his first first-class appearance for Ireland against Oxford University, scoring 71 in the only Irish innings and taking 4 for 140 when bowling. His previous service in the British Army had complicated any prior selection for Ireland, particularly as trouble instigated by the Irish Republican and plagued previous cricket matches in Ireland at the beginning of the 1920s. At the end of the season he made his final appearance for the Gentlemen against the Players.

In the winter which followed the 1926 season, Jameson was selected for the MCC's tour of South America. On the tour, he made four first-class appearances against the Argentine national team. He had notable all-round success during the tour, scoring two centuries in the first two matches of the tour and heading the tour batting averages, whilst also taking 32 wickets; 19 of these came in the first-class representative matches, with Jameson taking ten-wickets in the match at the Belgrano Club. Although he did not play first-class cricket during the 1927 English season, he did return in 1928, making four appearances for Hampshire, two for the MCC against the West Indians and Wales, and a second appearance for Ireland in a famous Irish victory against the West Indians. The following season he made seven appearances for Hampshire in the County Championship, at which point his career began to wind down. He was limited to two appearances for Hampshire in 1930, one of which came against the touring Australians, in addition to playing twice for the MCC. Two years would pass before Jameson next played first-class cricket, making a final appearance for Hampshire in the 1932 County Championship against Middlesex. For Hampshire, he made 53 appearances, in which he scored 2,013 runs at an average of 24.85; with the ball, he took 77 wickets at an average of 33.20. Jamesone continued to play cricket in Dublin for Na Shuler, before being chosen to tour India with Baron Tennyson's team in 1937–38. Aged 45 by the time of the tour, and in somewhat poor health during it, Jameson made six first-class appearances, but struggled in making 83 runs at an average of 11.85.

==== Playing style and career statistics ====
Described by The Cricketer as "a tall, stylish batsman and a particularly fine driver" and in The Times as "a very good and forcing batsman", in all first-class cricket Jameson scored 4,675 runs at an average of 26.56, scoring five centuries, with a top score of 133. "A more than useful slow bowler", he took 252 wickets at an average of 24.03 with his leg break bowling, taking eleven five wicket hauls. He was noted to have been prolific in dismissing Jack Hobbs, doing so on several occasions. As a fielder, he played in the slips and took 102 catches in first-class cricket.

== Racquets and squash ==
Jameson was also a fine racquets player, winning the Army singles championship in 1922, 1923 and 1924 and the doubles championship in 1920, 1921 and 1922. He reached the final of the amateur singles championship in 1924 and won the British Amateur Squash Championships during the 1922/23 and 1923/24 seasons. He was described as playing racquets "freely and beautifully on his back-hand as on his fore-hand", and in 1922 The Times suggested that he was the best racquets player produced by Harrow in the last twenty–years.

== Personal life and death ==
Jameson remained a major shareholder of Jameson's throughout his life. He married the artist Joan Musgrave (1892–1953) on 11 June 1920, with the couple having two sons. In later life, he lived in Ardmore in County Waterford. Jameson died in a care home in Dún Laoghaire near Dublin on 6 February 1965.
