= Geology of Scotland =

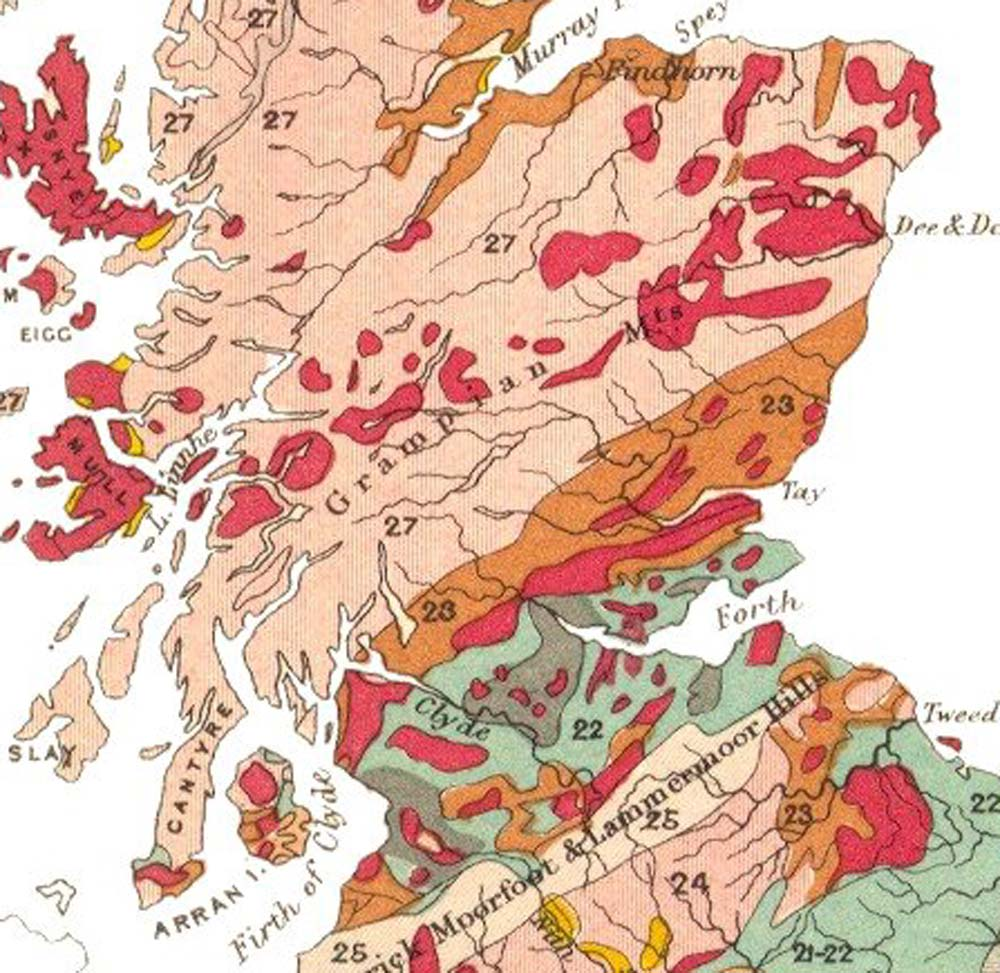
An early geological map of Central Scotland

The geology of Scotland is unusually varied for a country of its size, with a large number of different geological features. There are three main geographical sub-divisions: the Highlands and Islands is a diverse area which lies to the north and west of the Highland Boundary Fault; the Central Lowlands is a rift valley mainly comprising Palaeozoic formations; and the Southern Uplands, which lie south of the Southern Uplands Fault, are largely composed of Silurian deposits.

The existing bedrock includes very ancient Archean gneiss, metamorphic beds interspersed with granite intrusions created during the Caledonian mountain building period (the Caledonian orogeny), commercially important coal, oil and iron-bearing carboniferous deposits and the remains of substantial Palaeogene volcanoes. During their formation, tectonic movements created climatic conditions ranging from polar to desert to tropical and a resultant diversity of fossil remains.

Scotland has also had a role to play in many significant discoveries such as plate tectonics and the development of theories about the formation of rocks, and was the home of important figures in the development of the science including James Hutton (the "father of modern geology"), Hugh Miller and Archibald Geikie. Various locations such as 'Hutton's Unconformity' at Siccar Point in Berwickshire and the Moine Thrust in the northwest were also important in the development of geological science.

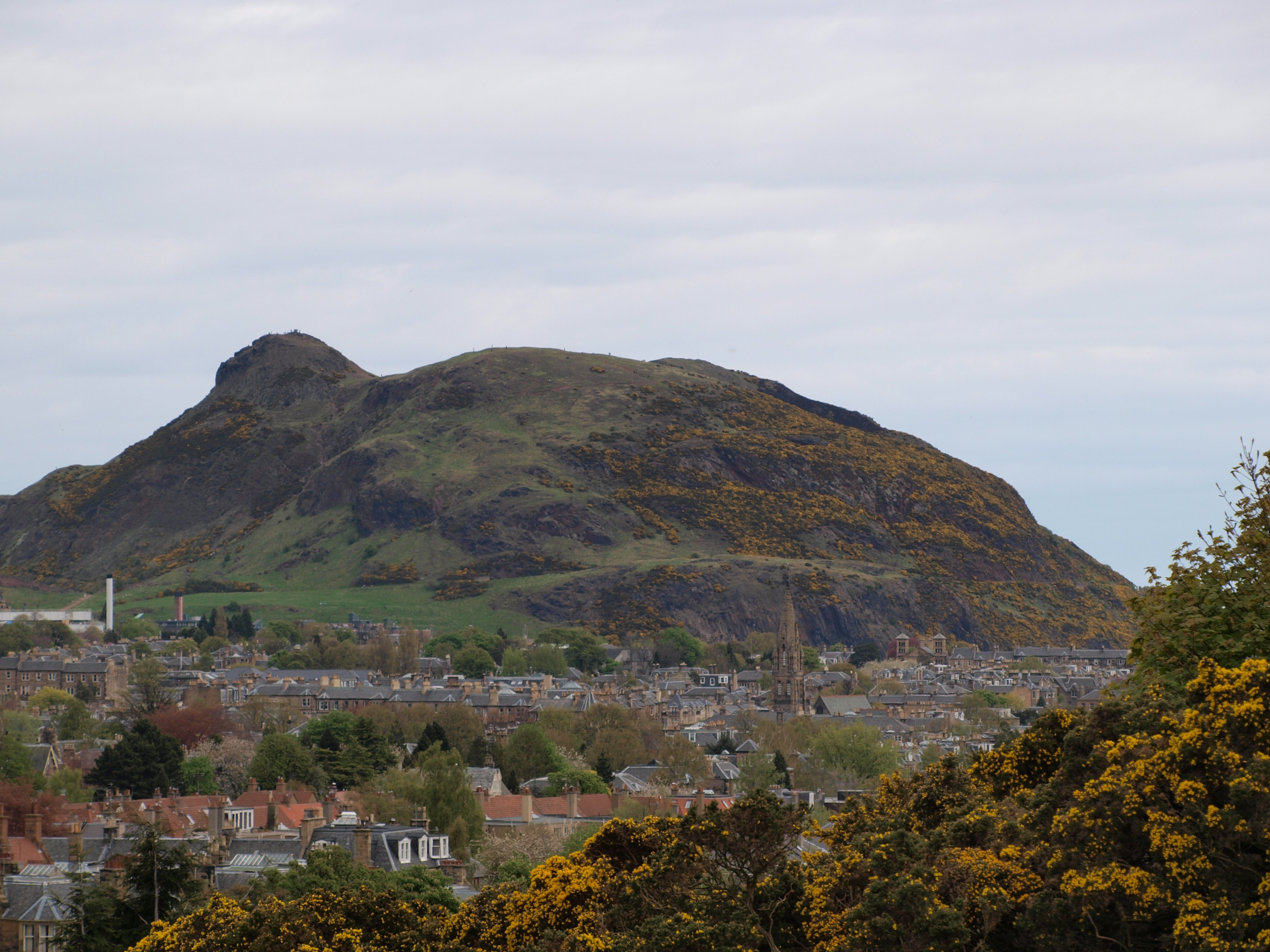
Arthur's Seat in Edinburgh, the eroded remains of a volcano active during the Carboniferous period

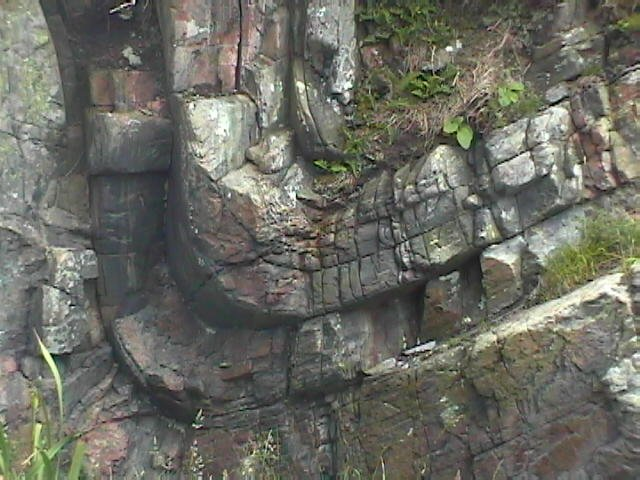
Folded rocks near Arnisdale

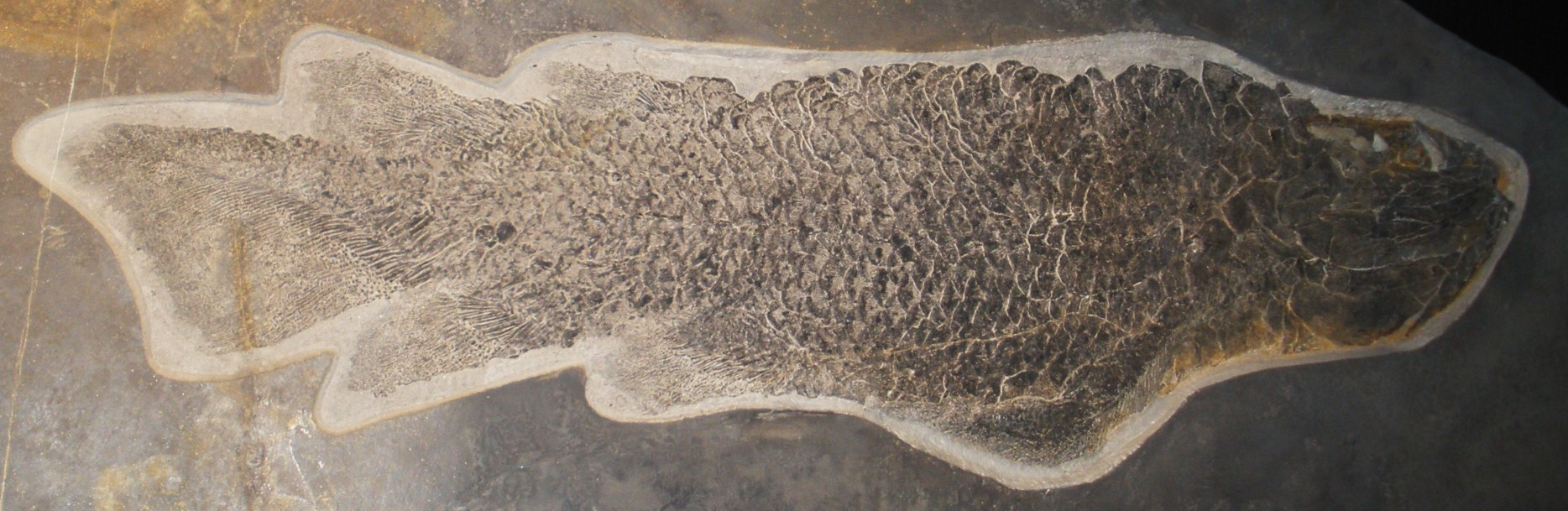
Glyptolepis paucidens fish fossil found in mid-Devonian rocks of Scotland

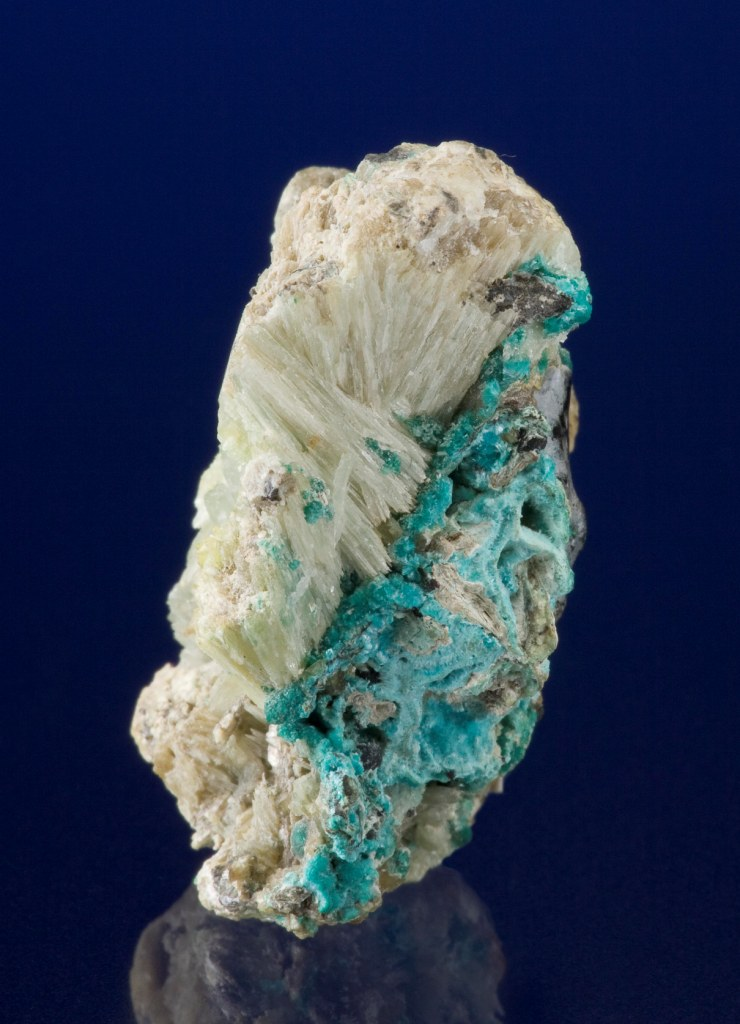
Lanarkite, susannite and macphersonite from Leadhills

== Overview ==
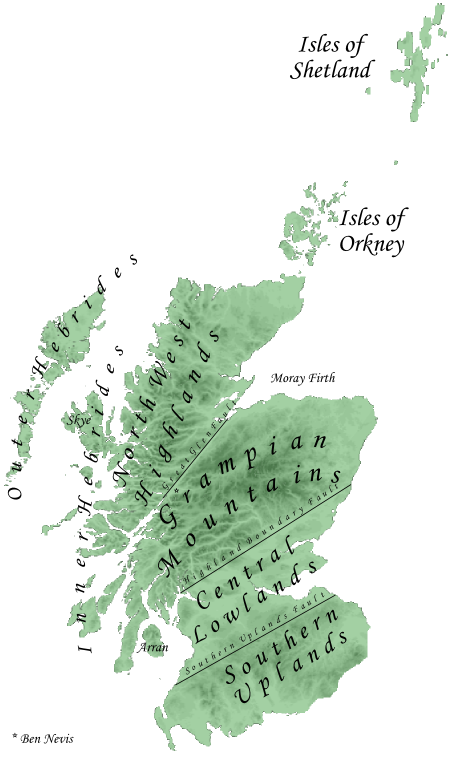
The main geographical divisions of Scotland

From a geological and geomorphological perspective the country has three main sub-divisions all of which were affected by Pleistocene glaciations.

=== Highlands and Islands ===
The Highlands and Islands lie to the north and west of the Highland Boundary Fault, which runs from Arran to Stonehaven. This part of Scotland largely comprises ancient rocks, from Cambrian and Precambrian times, that were uplifted to form a mountain chain during the later Caledonian orogeny. These foundations are interspersed with many igneous intrusions of more recent age, the remnants of which have formed mountain massifs such as the Cairngorms and Skye Cuillins. A significant exception to the above are the fossil-bearing beds of the Old Red Sandstone found principally along the Moray Firth coast and in the Orkney islands. These rocks are around 400 million years old, and were laid down in the Devonian period. The Highlands are generally mountainous and are bisected by the Great Glen Fault. The highest elevations in the British Isles are found here, including Ben Nevis, the highest peak at 1,344 metres (4,409 ft). Scotland has over 790 islands, divided into four main groups: Shetland, Orkney, and the Hebrides, further sub-divided into the Inner Hebrides and Outer Hebrides.

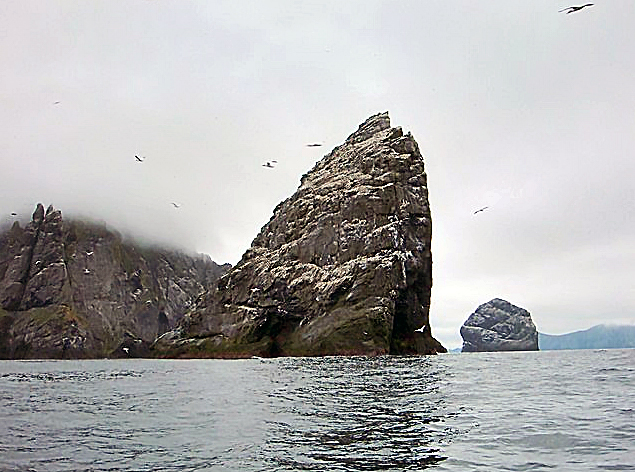
Stac an Armin, St Kilda

The Hebridean archipelago outlier of St Kilda is composed of Palaeogene igneous formations of granites and gabbro, heavily weathered by the elements. These islands represent the remnants of a long extinct ring volcano rising from a seabed plateau approximately 40 m (130 ft) below sea level.

The geology of Shetland is complex with numerous faults and folds. These islands are Scotland's most northerly area of Caledonian orogenic rocks and there are outcrops of Lewisian, Dalradian and Moine metamorphic rocks with similar histories to their equivalents on the Scottish mainland. Similarly, there are also Old Red Sandstone deposits and granite intrusions. The most distinctive feature is the ultrabasic ophiolite peridotite and gabbro on Unst and Fetlar, which are remnants of the Iapetus Ocean floor. Much of Shetland's economy depends on oil and gas production from fields in the surrounding seas.

=== Midland Valley ===
Often referred to as the Central Lowlands, this is a rift valley mainly comprising Palaeozoic formations. Many of these sediments have economic significance for it is here that the coal and iron bearing rocks that fuelled Scotland's Industrial Revolution are to be found. Although relatively low-lying, hills such as the Pentland Hills, Ochils and Campsie Fells are rarely far from view. This area has also experienced intense volcanism, Arthur's Seat in Edinburgh being the remnant of a once much larger volcano active in the Carboniferous period about 340 million years ago. As a result of ice age glaciers, drumlins were formed, and many hills have a crag and tail landform.

=== Southern Uplands ===
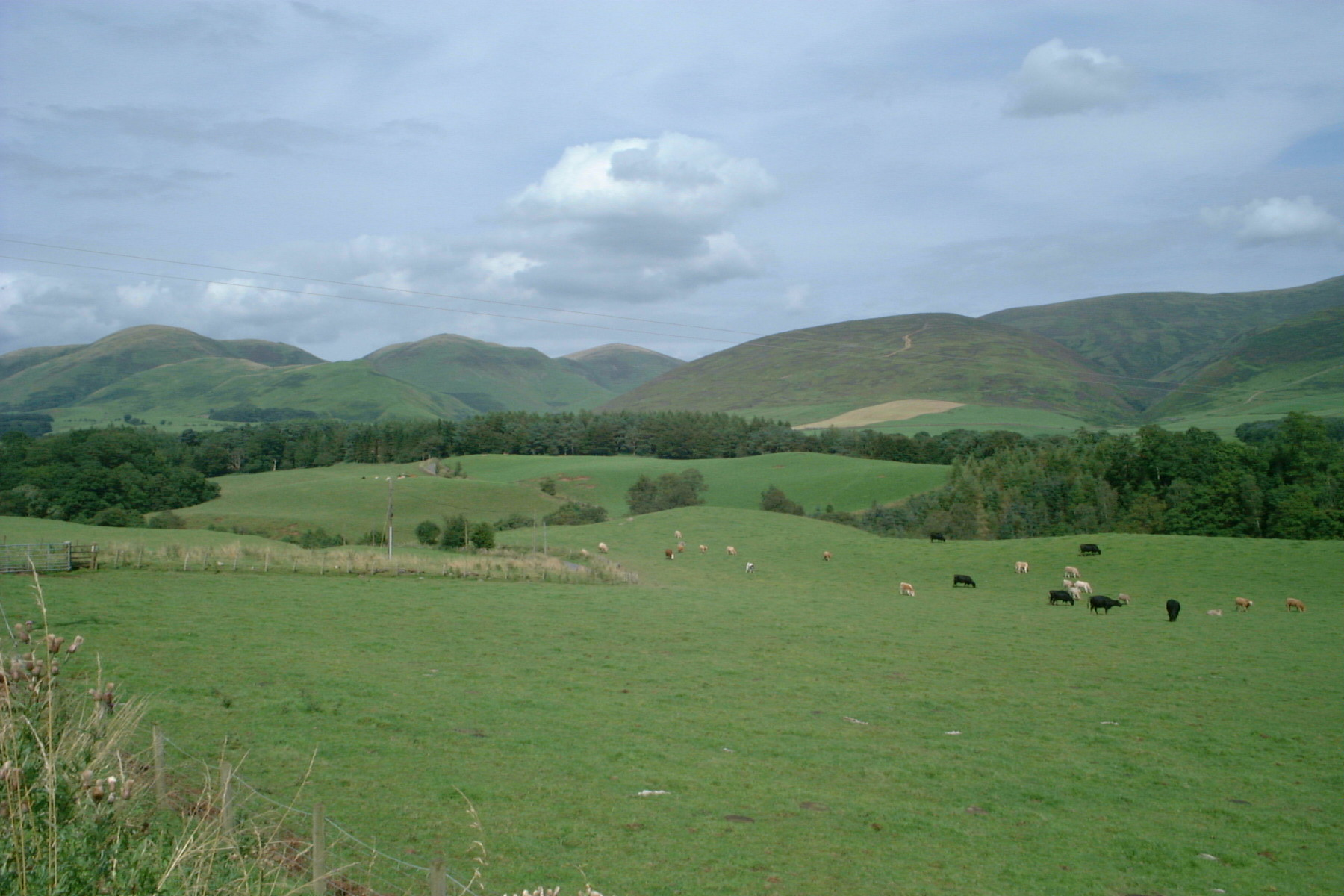
The Southern Uplands

The Southern Uplands are a range of hills almost 200 km (120 mi) long, interspersed with broad valleys. They lie south of a second fault line running from Ballantrae towards Dunbar. The geological foundations largely comprise Silurian deposits laid down some 4-500 million years ago.

=== Post-glacial events ===
The whole of Scotland was covered by ice sheets during the Pleistocene ice ages and the landscape is much affected by glaciation, and to a lesser extent by subsequent sea level changes. In the post-glacial epoch, circa 6100 BC, Scotland and the Faroe Islands experienced tsunamis up to 20 metres high caused by the Storegga Slides, a series of immense underwater landslides off the coast of Norway. Earth tremors are infrequent and usually slight. The Great Glen is the most seismically active area of Britain, but the last event of any size was in 1901.

== Chronology ==
=== Archean and Proterozoic eons ===
The oldest rocks of Scotland are the Lewisian gneisses, which were formed in the Precambrian period, up to 3,000 Ma (million years ago). They are among the oldest rocks in the world. They form the basement to the west of the Moine Thrust on the mainland, in the Outer Hebrides and on the islands of Coll and Tiree. These rocks are largely igneous in origin, mixed with metamorphosed marble, quartzite and mica schist and intruded by later basaltic dykes and granite magma. One of these intrusions forms the summit plateau of the mountain Roineabhal in Harris. The rock here is anorthosite, and is similar in composition to rocks found in the mountains of the Moon.

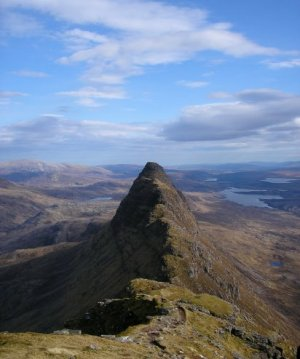
Suilven is formed of Torridonian sandstone, sitting on a landscape of Lewisian gneiss.

Torridonian sandstones were also laid down in this period over the gneisses, and these contain the oldest signs of life in Scotland. In later Precambrian times, thick sediments of sandstones, limestones muds and lavas were deposited in what is now the Highlands of Scotland.

=== Palaeozoic era ===
==== Cambrian period ====
Further sedimentary deposits were formed through the Cambrian period (541–485 Ma), some of which, along with the earlier Precambrian sediments, metamorphosed into the Dalradian series. This is composed of a wide variety of materials, including mica schist, biotite gneiss schist, schistose grit, greywacke and quartzite. The area that would become Scotland was at this time close to the south pole and part of Laurentia. Fossils from the north-west Highlands indicate the presence of trilobites and other primitive forms of life.

==== Ordovician period ====
The proto-Scotland landmass moved northwards, and from 460 to 430 Ma, sandstone, mudstone and limestone were deposited in the area that is now the Midland Valley. This occurred in shallow tropical seas at the margins of the Iapetus Ocean. The Ballantrae Complex near Girvan was formed from this ocean floor and is similar in composition to rocks found at The Lizard in Cornwall. Nonetheless, northern and southern Britain were far apart at the beginning of this period, although the gap began to close as the continent of Avalonia broke away from Gondwana, collided with Baltica and drifted towards Laurentia. The Caledonian orogeny began forming a mountain chain from Norway to the Appalachians. There was an ice age in the southern hemisphere, and the first mass extinction of life on Earth took place at the end of this period.

==== Silurian period ====
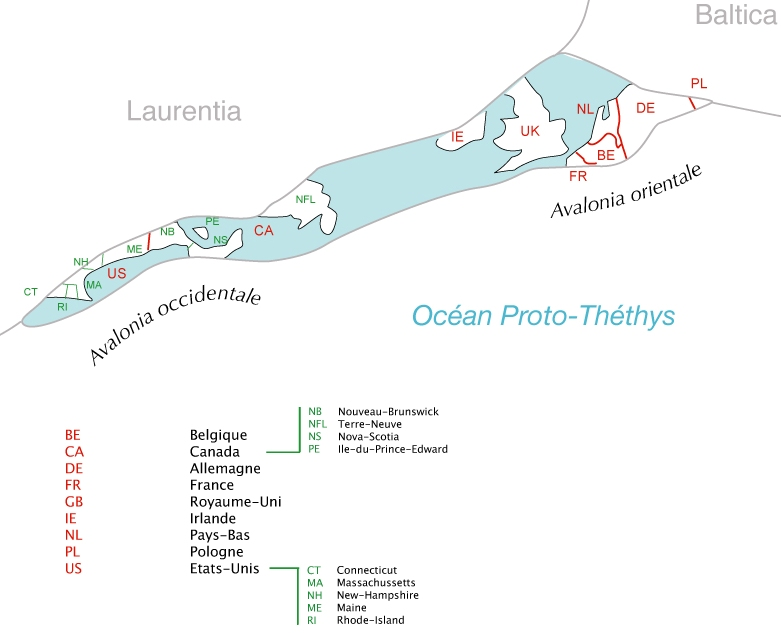
The collision of Avalonia, Baltica and Laurentia (The names are in French.)

During the Silurian period (444–419 Ma) the continent of Laurentia gradually collided with Baltica, joining Scotland to the area that would become England and Europe. Sea levels rose as the Ordovician ice sheets melted, and tectonic movements created major faults which assembled the outline of Scotland from previously scattered fragments. These faults are the Highland Boundary Fault, separating the Lowlands from the Highlands, the Great Glen Fault that divides the North-west Highlands from the Grampians, the Southern Uplands Fault and the Iapetus Suture, which runs from the Solway Firth to Lindisfarne and which marks the close of the Iapetus Ocean and the joining of northern and southern Britain.

Silurian rocks form the Southern Uplands of Scotland, which were pushed up from the sea bed during the collision with Baltica/Avalonia. The majority of the rocks are weakly metamorphosed coarse greywacke. The Highlands were also affected by these collisions, creating a series of thrust faults in the northwest Highlands including the Moine Thrust, the understanding of which played an important role in 19th century geological thinking. Volcanic activity occurred across Scotland as a result of the collision of the tectonic plates, with volcanoes in southern Scotland, and magma chambers in the north, which today form the granite mountains such as the Cairngorms.

==== Devonian period ====
The Old Red Sandstone Continent in the Devonian

The Scottish landmass now formed part of the Old Red Sandstone Continent and lay some 25 degrees south of the equator, moving slowly north during this period to 10 degrees south. The accumulations of Old Red Sandstone laid down from 408 to 370 million years ago were created as earlier Silurian rocks, uplifted by the formation of Pangaea, eroded and were deposited into a body of fresh water (probably a series of large river deltas). A huge freshwater lake - Lake Orcadie - existed on the edges of the eroding mountains stretching from Shetland to the southern Moray Firth. The formations are extremely thick, up to 11,000 metres in places, and can be subdivided into three categories "Lower", "Middle", and "Upper" from oldest to youngest. As a result, the Old Red Sandstone is an important source of fish fossils and it was the object of intense geological studies in the 19th century. In Scotland these rocks are found predominantly in the Moray Firth basin and Orkney Archipelago, and along the southern margins of the Highland Boundary Fault.

Elsewhere volcanic activity, possibly as a result of the closing of the Iapetus Suture, created the Cheviot Hills, Ochil Hills, Sidlaw Hills, parts of the Pentland Hills and Scurdie Ness on the Angus coast.

==== Carboniferous period ====
During the Carboniferous period (359–299 Ma), Scotland lay close to the equator. Several changes in sea level occurred and the coal deposits of Lanarkshire and West Lothian and limestones of Fife and Dunbar date from this time. There are oil shales near Bathgate around which the 19th-century oil-processing industry developed, and elsewhere in the Midland Valley there are ironstones and fire clay deposits that had significance in the early Industrial Revolution. Fossil Grove in Victoria Park, Glasgow contains the preserved remains of a Carboniferous forest. More volcanic activity formed Arthur's Seat and the Salisbury Crags in Edinburgh and the nearby Bathgate Hills.

==== Permian period ====
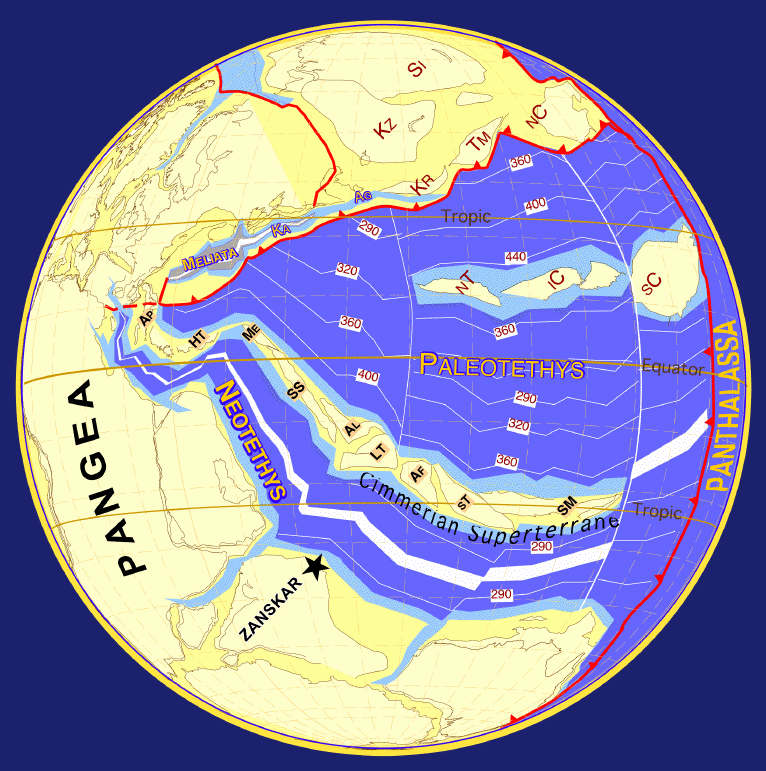
Map of Pangaea, during the Triassic period, 249 million years ago

The Old Red Sandstone Continent became a part of the supercontinent Pangaea in the Permian (299–252 Ma), during which proto-Britain continued to drift northwards. Scotland's climate was arid at this time and some fossils of reptiles have been recovered. However, Permian sandstones are found in only a few places - principally in the south west, on the island of Arran, and on the Moray coast. Stone quarried from Hopeman in Moray has been used in the National Museum and Scottish Parliament buildings in Edinburgh.

At the close of this period came the Permian–Triassic extinction event in which 96% of all marine species vanished and from which biodiversity took 30 million years to recover.

=== Mesozoic era ===
==== Triassic period ====
During the Triassic (252–201 Ma), much of Scotland remained in desert conditions, with higher ground in the Highlands and Southern Uplands providing sediment to the surrounding basins via flash floods. This is the origin of sandstone outcrops near Dumfries, Elgin and the Isle of Arran. Towards the close of this period sea levels began to rise and climatic conditions became less arid.

==== Jurassic period ====
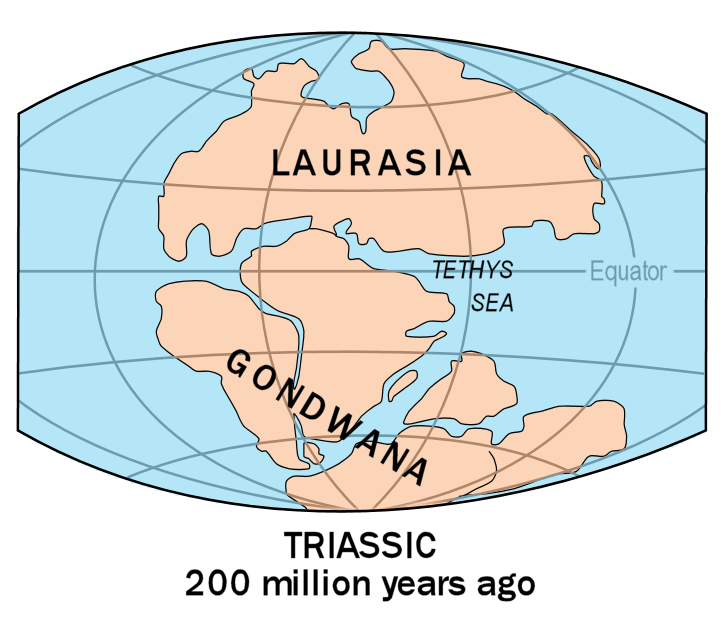
Pangaea was formed by the convergence of multiple continental masses and later broke apart to form two primary continents, Laurasia and Gondwana

As the Jurassic (201–145 Ma) started, Pangaea began to break up into two continents, Gondwana and Laurasia, marking the beginning of the separation of Scotland and North America. Sea levels rose, as Britain and Ireland drifted on the Eurasian Plate to between 30° and 40° north. Most of northern and eastern Scotland including Orkney, Shetland and the Outer Hebrides remained above the advancing seas, but the south and south-west were inundated. There are only isolated sedimentary rocks remaining on land from this period, on the Sutherland coast near Golspie and, forming the Great Estuarine Group, on Skye, Mull, Raasay and Eigg. This period does however have considerable significance. The burial of algae and bacteria below the mud of the sea floor during this time led to the formation of North Sea oil and natural gas, much of it trapped in overlying sandstone by deposits formed as the seas fell to form the swamps and salty lakes and lagoons that were home to dinosaurs.

==== Cretaceous period ====
In the Cretaceous (145–66 Ma), Laurasia split into the continents of North America and Eurasia. Sea levels rose globally during this period and much of low-lying Scotland was covered in a layer of chalk. Although large deposits of Cretaceous rocks were laid down over Scotland, these have not survived erosion except in a few places on the west coast such as Loch Aline in Morvern where they form a part of the Inner Hebrides Group. At the end of this period the Cretaceous–Palaeogene extinction event brought the age of dinosaurs to a close.

=== Cenozoic era ===
==== Palaeogene period ====
In the early Palaeogene period between 63 and 52 Ma, the last volcanic rocks in the British Isles were formed. As North America and Greenland separated from Europe, the Atlantic Ocean slowly formed. This led to a chain of volcanic sites west of mainland Scotland including on Skye, the Small Isles and St. Kilda, in the Firth of Clyde on Arran and Ailsa Craig and at Ardnamurchan. Sea levels began to fall, and for the first time the general outline of the modern British Isles was revealed. At the beginning of this period the climate was sub-tropical and erosion was caused by chemical weathering, creating characteristic features of the Scottish landscape such as the topographical basin of the Howe of Alford near Aberdeen. The vegetation of the period is known from Palaeocene sedimentary deposits on Isle of Mull. The rich flora here included temperate-climate tree species such as plane, hazel, oak, Cercidiphyllum, Metasequoia and ginkgo.

==== Neogene period ====
===== Miocene and Pliocene epochs =====
In the Miocene and Pliocene epochs further uplift and erosion occurred in the Highlands. Plant and animal types developed into their modern forms. Scotland lay in its present position on the globe. As the Miocene progressed, temperatures dropped and remained similar to today's.

==== Quaternary period ====
===== Pleistocene epoch =====
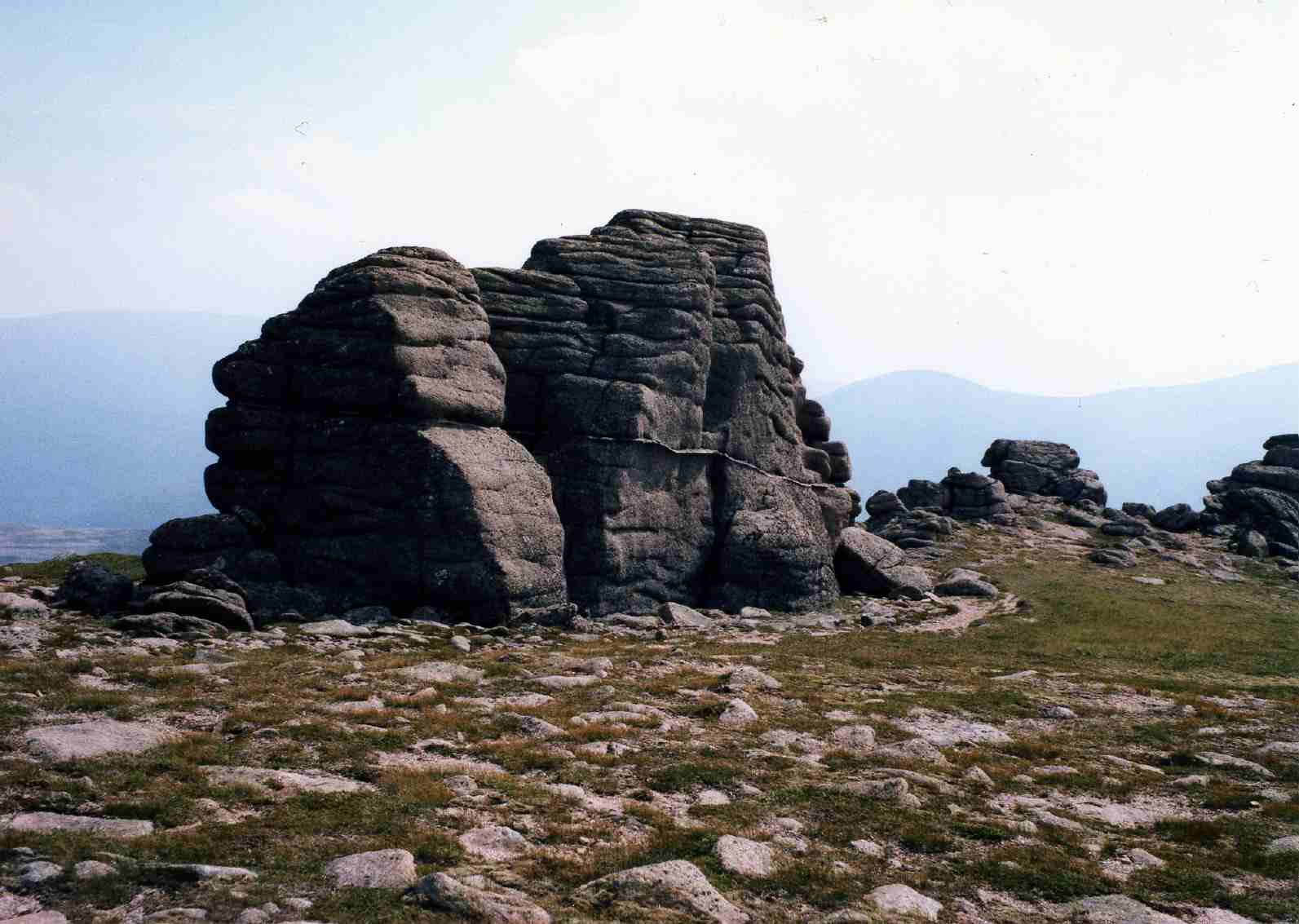
The 'Barns of Bynack' - tors on the summit plateau of Bynack More, Cairngorms National Park

Several ice ages shaped the land through glacial erosion, creating u-shaped valleys and depositing boulder clays, especially on the western seaboard. The last major incursion of ice peaked about 18,000 years ago, leaving other remnant features such at the granite tors on the Cairngorm mountain plateaux.

===== Holocene epoch =====
Over the last twelve thousand years the most significant new geological features have been the deposits of peat and the development of coastal alluvium. Post-glacial rises in sea level have been combined with isostatic rises of the land resulting in a relative fall in sea level in most areas. In some places, such as Culbin in Moray, these changes in relative sea level have created a complex series of shorelines. A rare type of Scottish coastline found largely in the Hebrides consists of machair habitat, a low lying dune pasture land formed as the sea level dropped leaving a raised beach. In the present day, Scotland continues to move slowly north.

== Geologists in Scotland ==
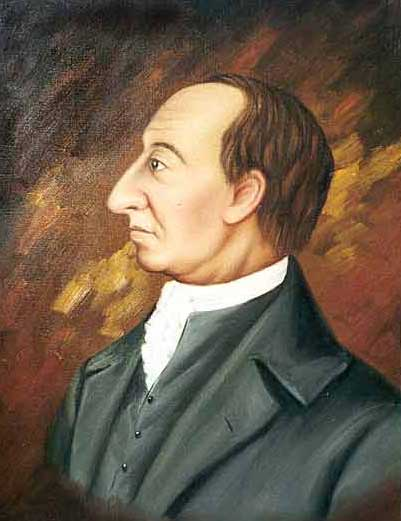
James Hutton, painted by Abner Lowe

Scottish geologists and non-Scots working in Scotland have played an important part in the development of the science, especially during its pioneering period in the late 18th century and 19th century.

- James Hutton (1726–1797), the "father of modern geology", was born in Edinburgh. His Theory of the Earth, published in 1788, proposed the idea of a rock cycle in which weathered rocks form new sediments and that granites were of volcanic origin. At Glen Tilt in the Cairngorm mountains he found granite penetrating metamorphic schists. This showed to him that granite formed from the cooling of molten rock, not precipitation out of water as the Neptunists of the time believed. This sight is said to have "filled him with delight". Regarding geological time scales he famously remarked "that we find no vestige of a beginning, no prospect of an end".
- John Playfair (1748–1819) from Angus was a mathematician who developed an interest in geology through his friendship with Hutton. His 1802 Illustrations of the Huttonian Theory of the Earth were influential in the latter's success.
- John MacCulloch (1773–1835) was born in Guernsey and like Hutton before him, studied medicine at Edinburgh University. A president of the Geological Society from 1815 to 1817, he is best remembered for producing the first geological map of Scotland, published in 1836. 'MacCulloch's Tree', a 40-foot (12 m) high fossil conifer in the Mull lava flows, is named after him.

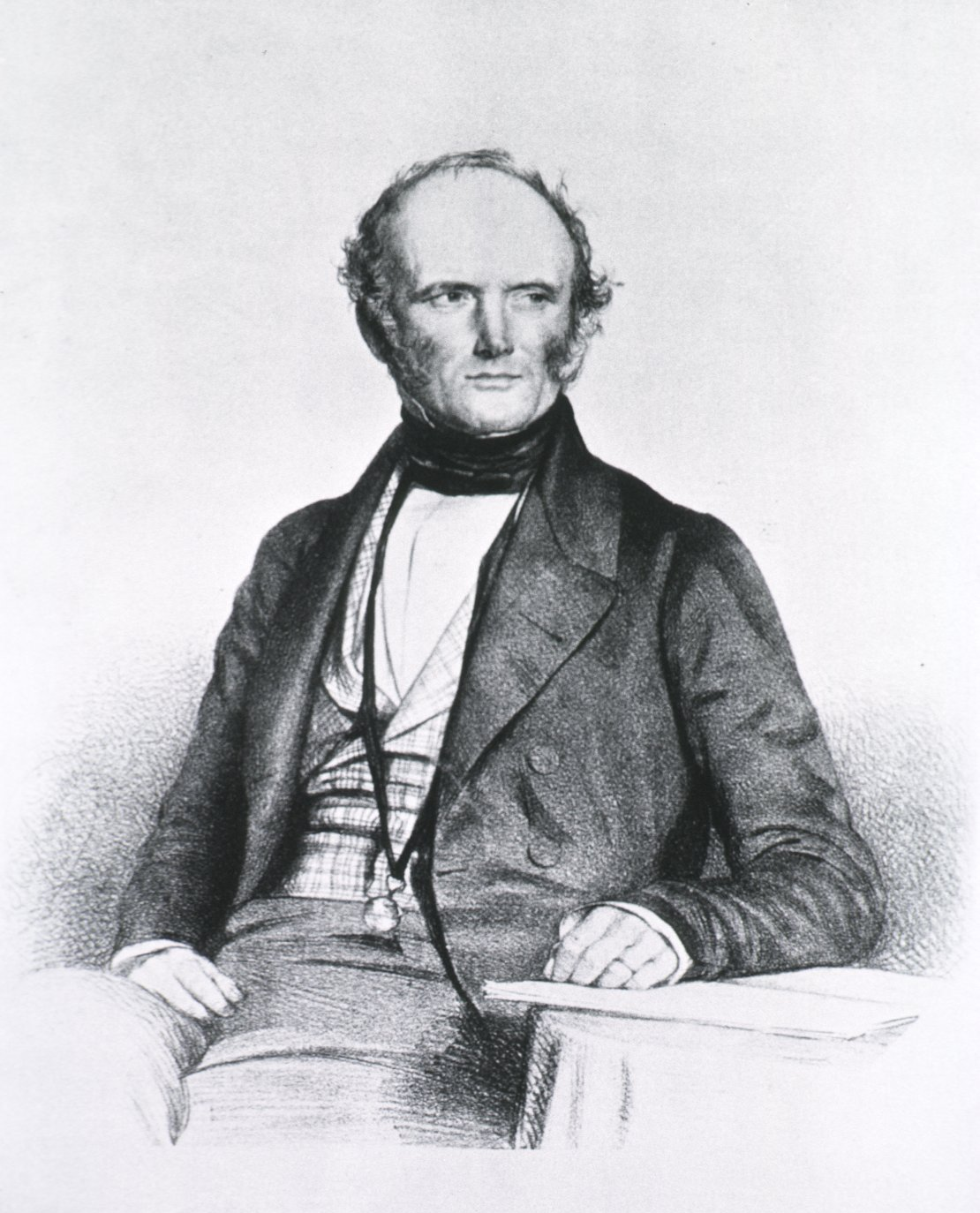
Charles Lyell

- Sir Charles Lyell (1797–1875) was also from Angus and his Principles of Geology built on Hutton's ideas. Lyell's theory of uniformitarianism and his interpretation of geologic change as the steady accumulation of minute changes over enormously long spans of time was a central theme in the Principles, and a powerful influence on the young Charles Darwin. (Robert FitzRoy, captain of HMS Beagle, loaned Darwin a copy of Volume 1 of the first edition just before they set out on the 'Voyage of the Beagle'.) Lyell is buried in Westminster Abbey.

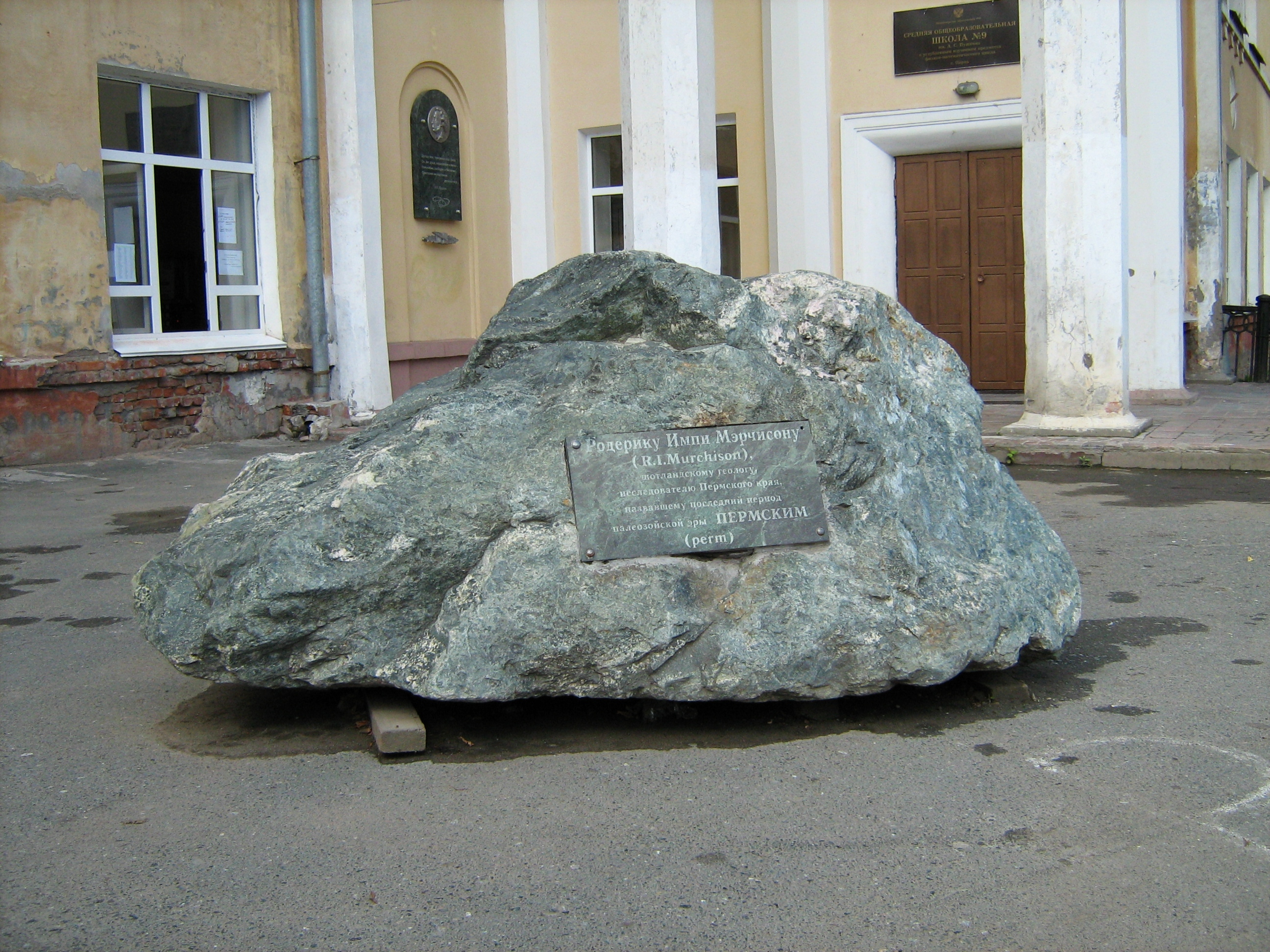
Murchison's memorial tablet in Perm, Russia. "To Roderick Impey Murchison, Scottish geologist, explorer of Perm Krai, who gives to the last period of the Palaeozoic era the name of Permian."

- Sir Roderick Murchison (1792–1871) was born in Ross and Cromarty and served under Wellesley in the Peninsular War. Knighted in 1846, his main achievements were the investigation of Silurian rocks published as The Silurian System in 1839 and of Permian deposits in Russia. The Murchison crater on the Moon and at least fifteen geographical locations on Earth are named after him.
- Hugh Miller (1802–56) from Cromarty was a stonemason and self-taught geologist. His 1841 publication The Old Red Sandstone became a bestseller. The fossils founds in these rocks were one of his fascinations, although his deep religious convictions led him to oppose the idea of biological evolution.
- James Croll (1821–90) developed a theory of climate change based on changes in the Earth's orbit. Born near Perth, he was self-educated and his interest in science led to his becoming appointed as a janitor in the museum at the Andersonian College and Museum, Glasgow in 1859. His 1864 paper On the Physical Cause of the Changes of Climate during Glacial Epochs led to a position in the Edinburgh office of the Geological Survey of Scotland, as keeper of maps and correspondence, where Sir Archibald Geikie, encouraged his research. He was eventually to become a Fellow of the Royal Society.
- Sir Archibald Geikie (1835–1924) was the first to recognise that there had been multiple glaciations, and his 1863 paper On the glacial drift of Scotland was a landmark in the emergent theories of glaciation. He became Director-General of the Geological Survey of the United Kingdom in 1888 and was also well known for his work on volcanism.
- Arthur Holmes (1890–1965) was born in England and became Regius Professor of Geology at the University of Edinburgh in 1943. His magnum opus was Principles of Physical Geology, first published in 1944, in which he proposed the idea that slow moving convection currents in the Earth's mantle created 'continental drift' as it was then called. He also pioneered the discipline of geochronology. He lived long enough to see the theory of plate tectonics become widely accepted, and he is regarded as one of the most influential geologists of the 20th century.

== Important sites ==
=== Siccar Point ===
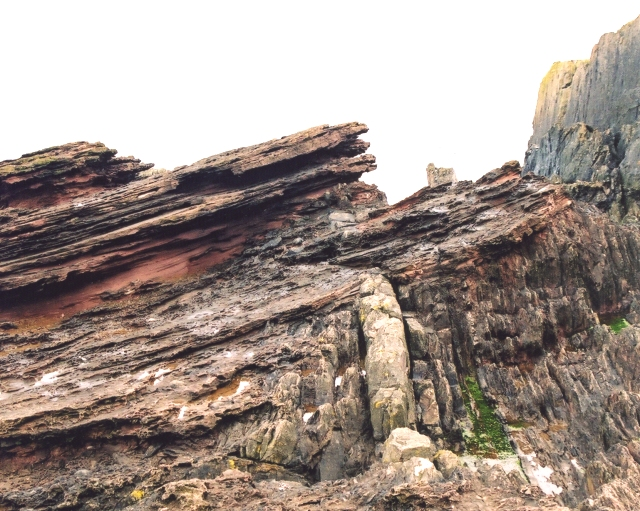
Angled Devonian and Silurian strata of 'Hutton's Unconformity' at Siccar Point, Berwickshire

Siccar Point, Berwickshire is world-famous as one of the sites that proved Hutton's views about the immense age of the Earth. Here Silurian rocks have been tilted almost to the vertical. Younger Carboniferous rocks lie unconformably over the top of them, dipping gently, indicating that an enormous span of time must have passed between the creation of the two beds. When Hutton and James Hall visited the site in 1788 their companion Playfair wrote:

On us who saw these phenomenon for the first time the impression will not easily be forgotten...We felt necessarily carried back to a time when the schistus on which we stood was yet at the bottom of the sea, and when the sandstone before us was only beginning to be deposited, in the shape of sand or mud, from the waters of the supercontinent ocean... The mind seemed to grow giddy by looking so far back into the abyss of time; and whilst we listened with earnestness and admiration to the philosopher who was now unfolding to us the order and series of these wonderful events, we became sensible how much further reason may sometimes go than imagination may venture to follow. —John Playfair (1805) Transactions of the Royal Society of Edinburgh, vol. V, pt. III.

=== Knockan Crag ===
The Moine Thrust in Assynt is one of the most studied geological features in the world. Its discovery in the 1880s was a milestone in the history of geology as it was one of the first thrust belts in the world to be identified. Investigations by John Horne and Benjamin Peach resolved a dispute between Murchison and Geikie on the one hand and James Nicol and Charles Lapworth on the other. The latter believed that older Moine rocks lay on top of younger Cambrian rocks at Knockan Crag, and Horne and Peach's work confirmed this in their classic paper The Geological Structure of the North-West Highlands of Scotland, which was published in 1907. A statue to these two pioneers of fieldwork was erected at Inchnadamph near the hotel there which played a prominent part in the annals of early geology. This area is at the heart of the 'North West Highlands Geopark'.

=== Dob's Linn ===
Lapworth also had a prominent role to play in the fame of Dob's Linn, a small gorge in the Scottish Borders, which contains the 'golden spike' (i.e. the official international boundary or stratotype) between the Ordovician and Silurian periods. Lapworth's work in this area, especially his examination of the complex stratigraphy of the Silurian rocks by comparing fossil graptolites, was crucial in to the early understanding of these epochs.

=== Skye Cuillin ===
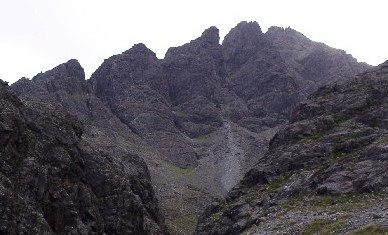
Sgurr nan Gillean and the Pinnacle Ridge from Basteir gorge, Skye. James Forbes and Duncan MacIntyre completed the first recorded climb of this mountain in 1836.

The Skye Cuillin mountains provide classic examples of glacial topography and were the subject of an early published account by James Forbes in 1846 (who had become a fellow of the Royal Society of Edinburgh aged only nineteen). He partnered Louis Agassiz on his trip to Scotland in 1840 and although they subsequently argued, Forbes went on to publish other important papers on Alpine glaciers. In 1904 Alfred Harker published The Tertiary Igneous Rocks of Skye, the first detailed scientific study of an extinct volcano.

=== Strontian ===
In the hills to the north of the village of Strontian the mineral strontianite was discovered, from which the element strontium was first isolated by Sir Humphry Davy in 1808.

=== Staffa ===
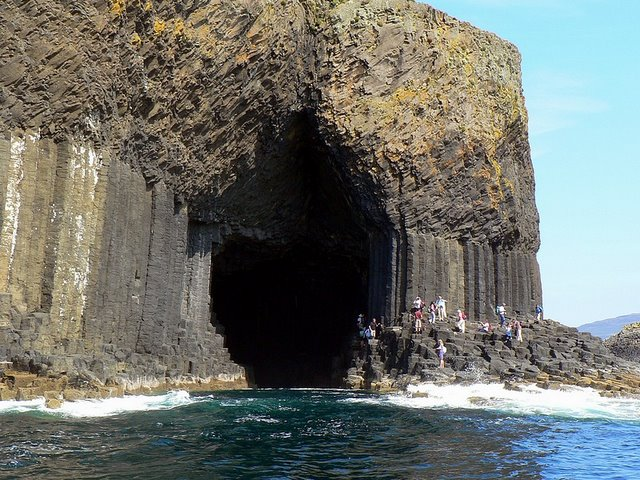
Fingal's Cave

The island of Staffa contains Fingal's Cave made up of massive hexagonal columns of Palaeogene basalt.

=== Schiehallion ===
The isolated position and regular shape of Schiehallion, a Munro in Perthshire, led Nevil Maskelyne to use the deflection caused by the mass of the mountain to estimate the mass of the Earth in a ground-breaking experiment carried out in 1774. Following Maskelyne's survey, Schiehallion became the first mountain to be mapped using contour lines.

=== Rhynie ===
The village of Rhynie in Aberdeenshire is the site of an important sedimentary deposit - Rhynie chert. The bulk of this fossil bed consists of primitive plants that had water-conducting cells and sporangia but no leaves, along with arthropods: Collembola, Opiliones (harvestmen), pseudoscorpions and the extinct, spider-like Trigonotarbids. This fossil bed is remarkable for two reasons. Firstly, the age of the find (early Devonian circa 410 Ma) makes this one of the earliest sites anywhere containing terrestrial fossils, coinciding with the first stages of the colonisation of land by plants and animals. Secondly, these cherts are famous for their exceptional state of ultrastructural preservation, with individual cell walls easily visible in polished specimens. For example, stomata have been counted and lignin remnants detected in the plant material.

=== East Kirkton quarry ===
A disused quarry at East Kirkton in the Bathgate Hills is the location where the Carboniferous fossil of Westlothiana lizziae (aka 'Lizzie') was found in 1984. This lizard is one of the earliest known ancestors of the reptiles. The specimen was purchased in part by public subscription and is now on display in the National Museum of Scotland. The site was originally discovered in the early 19th century and has also provided fossil eurypterids, sharks and a variety of primitive acanthodian fish.

=== Wester Ross bolide ===
In 2008 the ejected material from a meteorite impact crater was discovered near Ullapool in Wester Ross. Preserved within sedimentary layers of sandstone, this is the largest known bolide impact from what are now the British Isles.

== See also ==
- British Geological Survey
- Coal measures
- Geography of Scotland
- Geologic timescale
- Geological groups of Great Britain
- Geology of the British Isles

- Geology of England
- Geology of Ireland
- Geology of Orkney
- Geology of Wales

- New Red Sandstone
