= Hutton's Unconformity =

Name given to various notable geological sites in Scotland

Hutton's Unconformity is a name given to various notable geological sites in Scotland identified by the 18th-century Scottish geologist James Hutton as places where the junction between two types of rock formations can be seen. This geological phenomenon marks the location where rock formations created at different times and by different processes adjoin. For Hutton, such an unconformity provided evidence for his Plutonist theories of uniformitarianism and the age of Earth.

An unconformity is a break in the normal progression of sedimentary deposits, where newer deposits are laid on top of older. The example Hutton discovered is known as an angular unconformity in which a sharp change in younging direction can be seen in the orientation of bedding planes. The younging direction points from the oldest bed, to the youngest bed in the sequence of sedimentary beds.

In his search, Hutton and colleagues examined rock outcrops and cliffs, both riverside and sea, and found several locations where two adjoining rock types had been laid bare, the most noted being at Siccar Point on the coast of Berwickshire.

== Theory of rock formations ==
Hutton hit on a variety of ideas to explain the rock formations he saw, and, after a quarter century of work, he read his paper, Theory of the Earth; or an Investigation of the Laws Observable in the Composition, Dissolution and Restoration of Land upon the Globe, to the Royal Society of Edinburgh on 7 March and 4 April 1785.

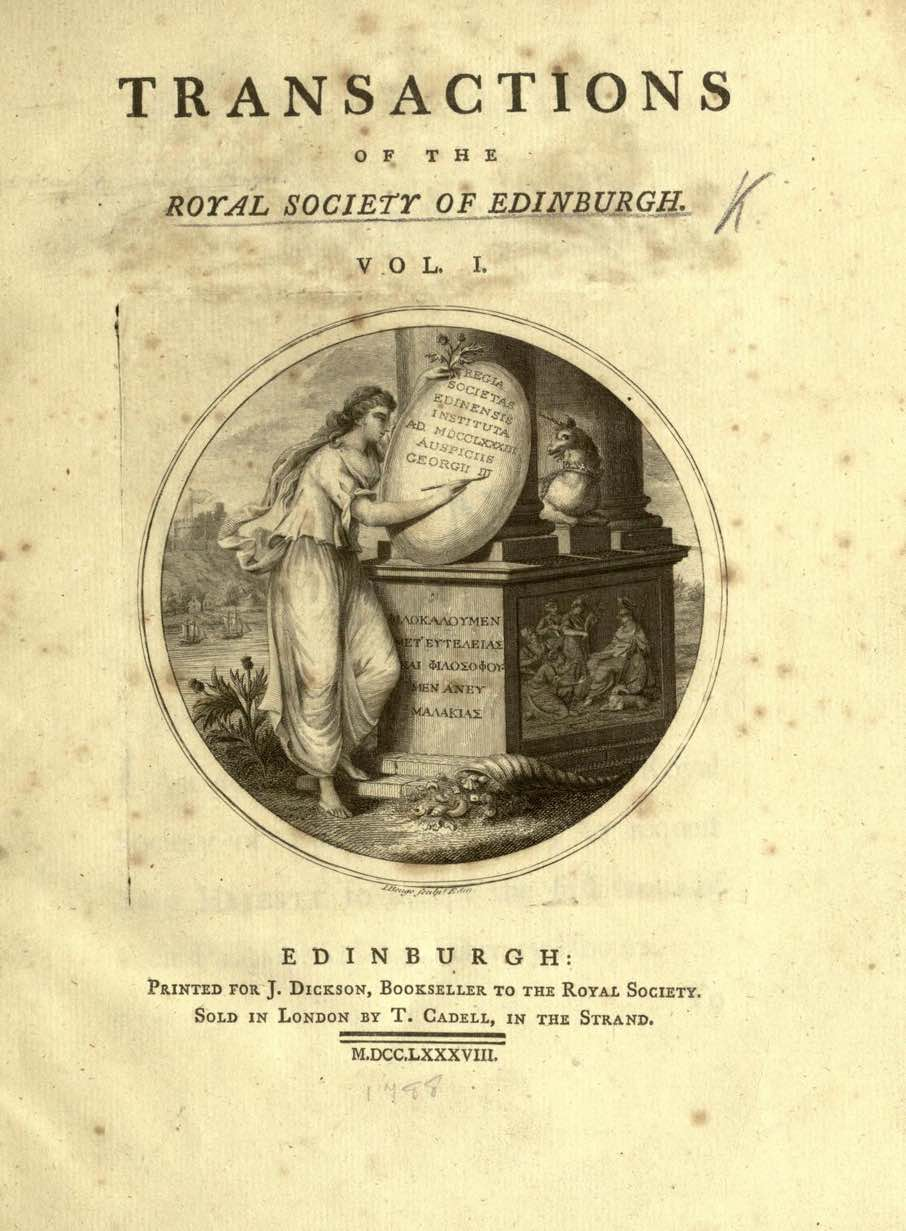
Cover of the journal Transactions of the Royal Society of Edinburgh. This is the issue where James Hutton published his Theory of the Earth in 1788.

Later that year Hutton read an abstract of Concerning the System of the Earth, its Duration and Stability to a Society meeting, and had it printed and circulated privately. In it, he outlined his theory that the "solid parts of the present land appear in general, to have been composed of the productions of the sea, and of other materials similar to those now found upon the shores."

From this he deduced that the land was a composition which had been formed by the operation of second causes in an earlier world composed of sea and land, with tides, currents, and "such operations at the bottom of the sea as now take place" so that "while the present land was forming at the bottom of the ocean, the former land maintained plants and animals; at least the sea was then inhabited by animals, in a similar manner as it is at present", and that most, if not all, of the land had been produced by natural operations involving the consolidation of masses of loose materials collected at the bottom of the sea, followed by the elevation of the consolidated masses to their present position.

== Hutton's search for unconformities ==
Early geologists had interpreted angular unconformities in terms of Neptunism (holding that rocks had formed from the crystallisation of minerals from ocean waters after Noah's Flood) but Hutton wanted to examine such formations himself in support for his theory of Plutonism, in which rocks are formed from volcanic action.

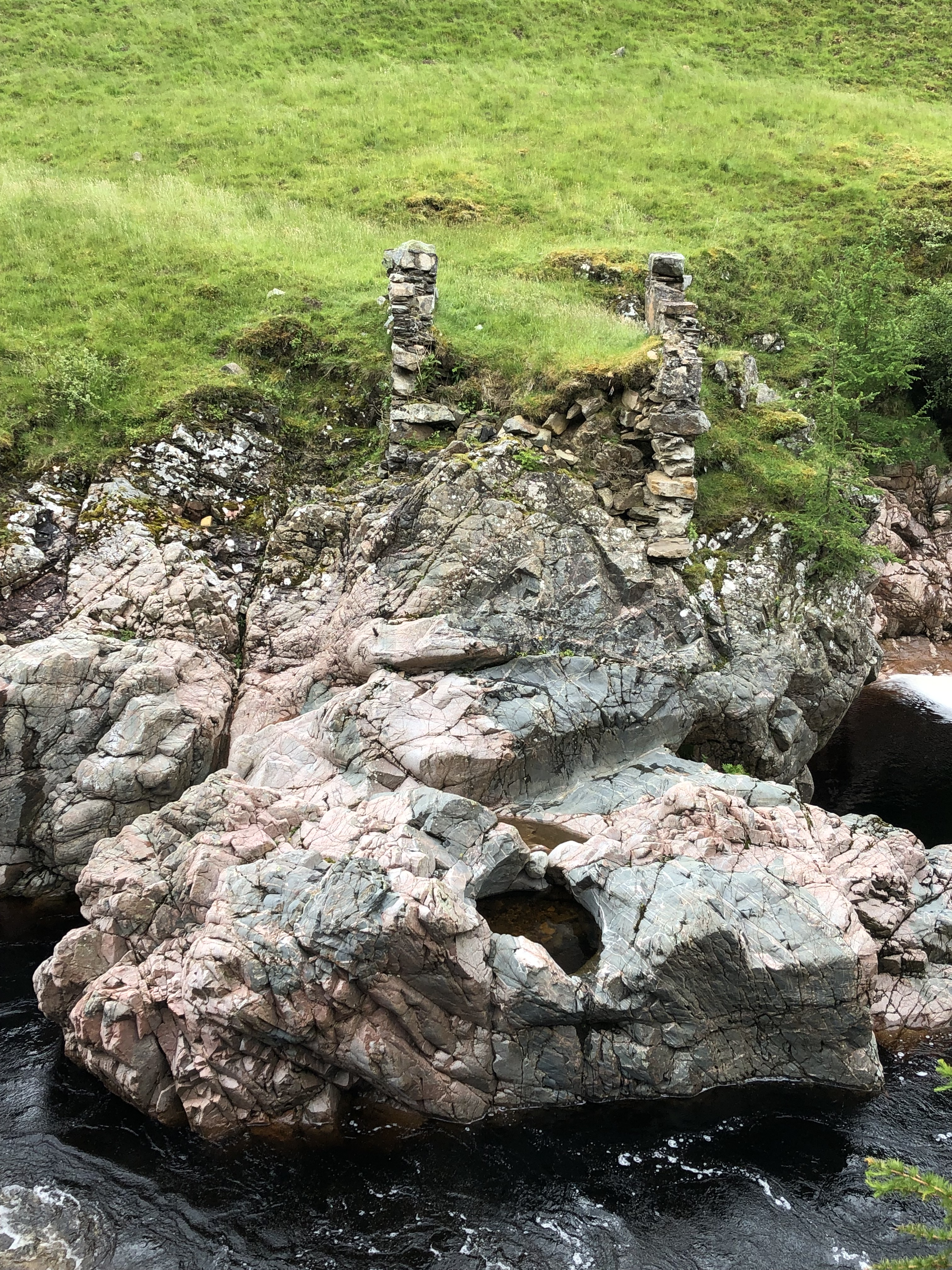
Hutton's Glen Tilt exposure at the collapsed Dail-an-eas Bridge upstream from Forest Lodge, drawn by John Clerk of Eldin in 1785; N 56.85109, W 3.74187

In 1785 on Hutton's first field excursion, he was invited by the Duke of Atholl to search for exposures in a remarkably straight, deeply incised valley in the Scottish Highlands known as the Glen Tilt, near the town of Blair Atholl. Upstream of one of the Duke's hunting lodges, known as Forest Lodge, Hutton and his friend, John Clerk of Eldin, found exposures at the Dail-an-eas Bridge that demonstrated red igneous granite veins were injected into older grey schists formations. This discovery proved that Werner's Neptunism theory was in error. Werner argued that sedimentary rocks, including what are now known as metamorphic rocks such as schists, were formed after granites. John Clerk drew these exposures with great accuracy and these drawings provide important visual evidence of Hutton's discoveries.

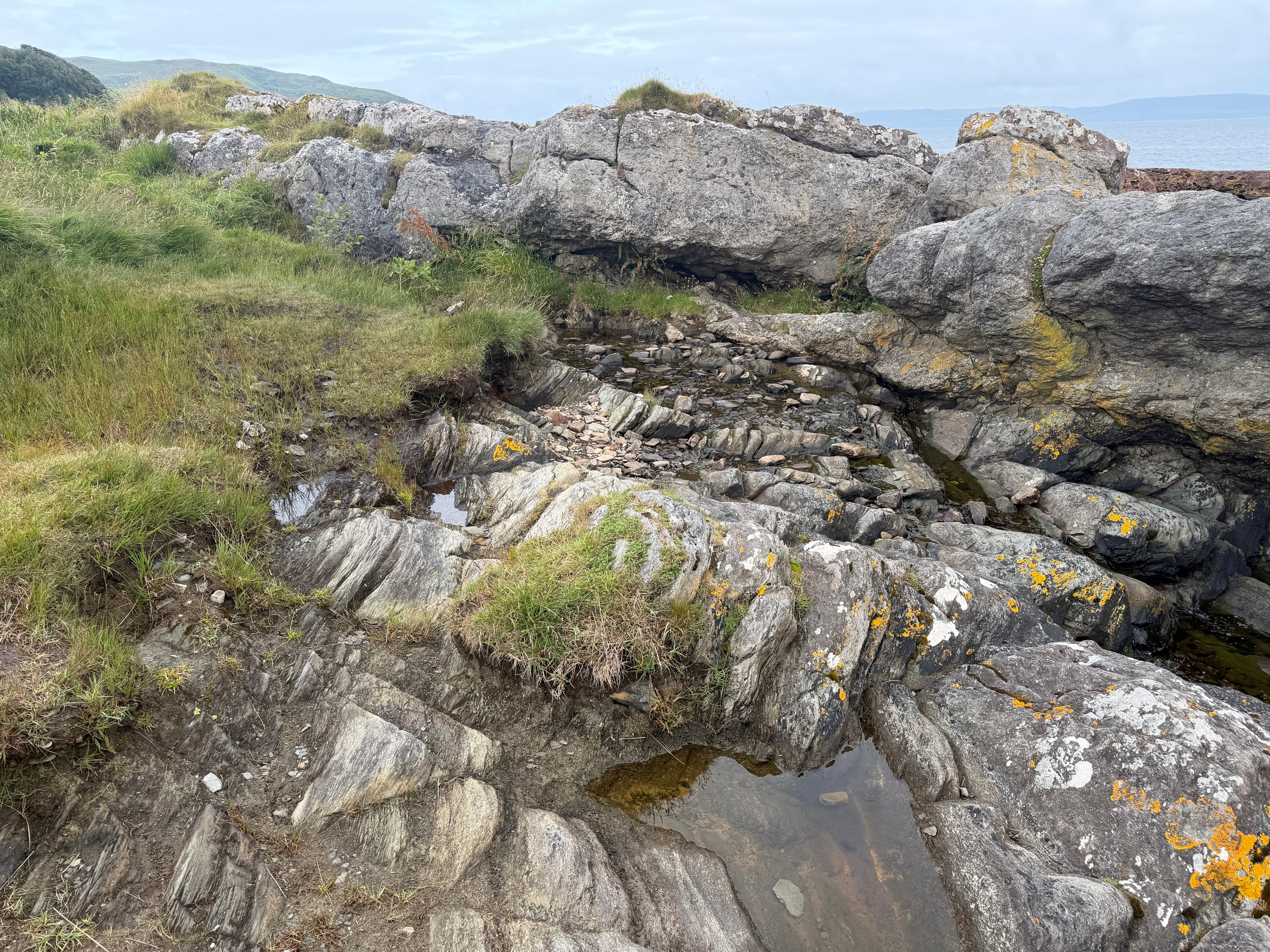
Hutton’s First Unconformity at Newton Shore on the Island of Arran; N 55.718072, -5.287987

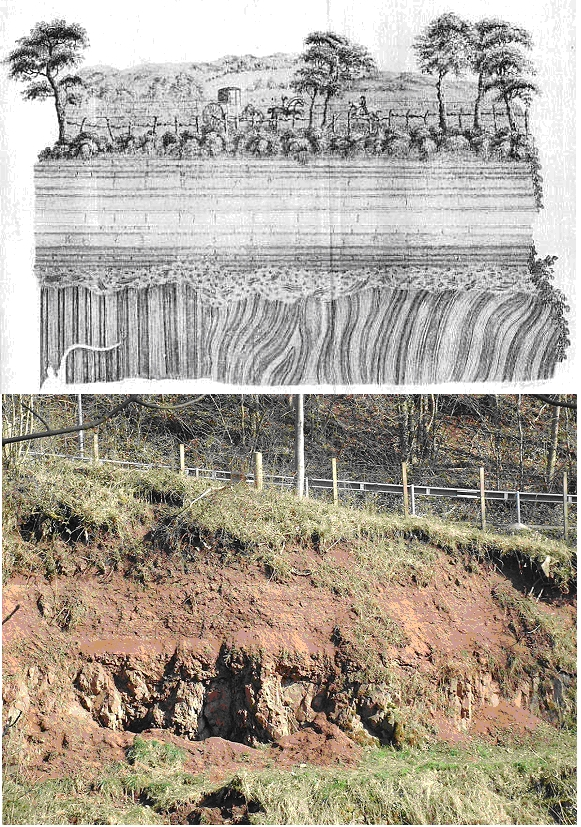
Hutton Unconformity at Inchbonny, Jedburgh. A photograph shows the current scene (2003), below John Clerk, Lord Eldin's illustration of 1787; N 55.4721, W 2.5545

On a trip to the Isle of Arran in 1787 he found his first example of an unconformity to the north of Newton Point near Lochranza, but the limited view did not give the information he needed. It occurs where vertically orientated Precambrian Dalradian schists are overlain by more recent cornstones in the Kinnesswood Formation of the Inverclyde Group (Lower Carboniferous), with an obvious difference in dip between the two rock layers, but he incorrectly thought that the strata were conformable at a depth below the exposed outcrop. In 2017, the Arran Geopark Project erected a marker stone to indicate the significance of Hutton's discovery and its location (map reference: NR936521)

Later in 1787 Hutton noted what is now known as the Hutton Unconformity at Inchbonny, Jedburgh, in layers of sedimentary rock visible on the banks of the Jed Water. He later wrote of how he "rejoiced at my good fortune in stumbling upon an object so interesting in the natural history of the earth, and which I had been long looking for in vain". That year he found the same sequence in Teviotdale.

=== Siccar Point ===
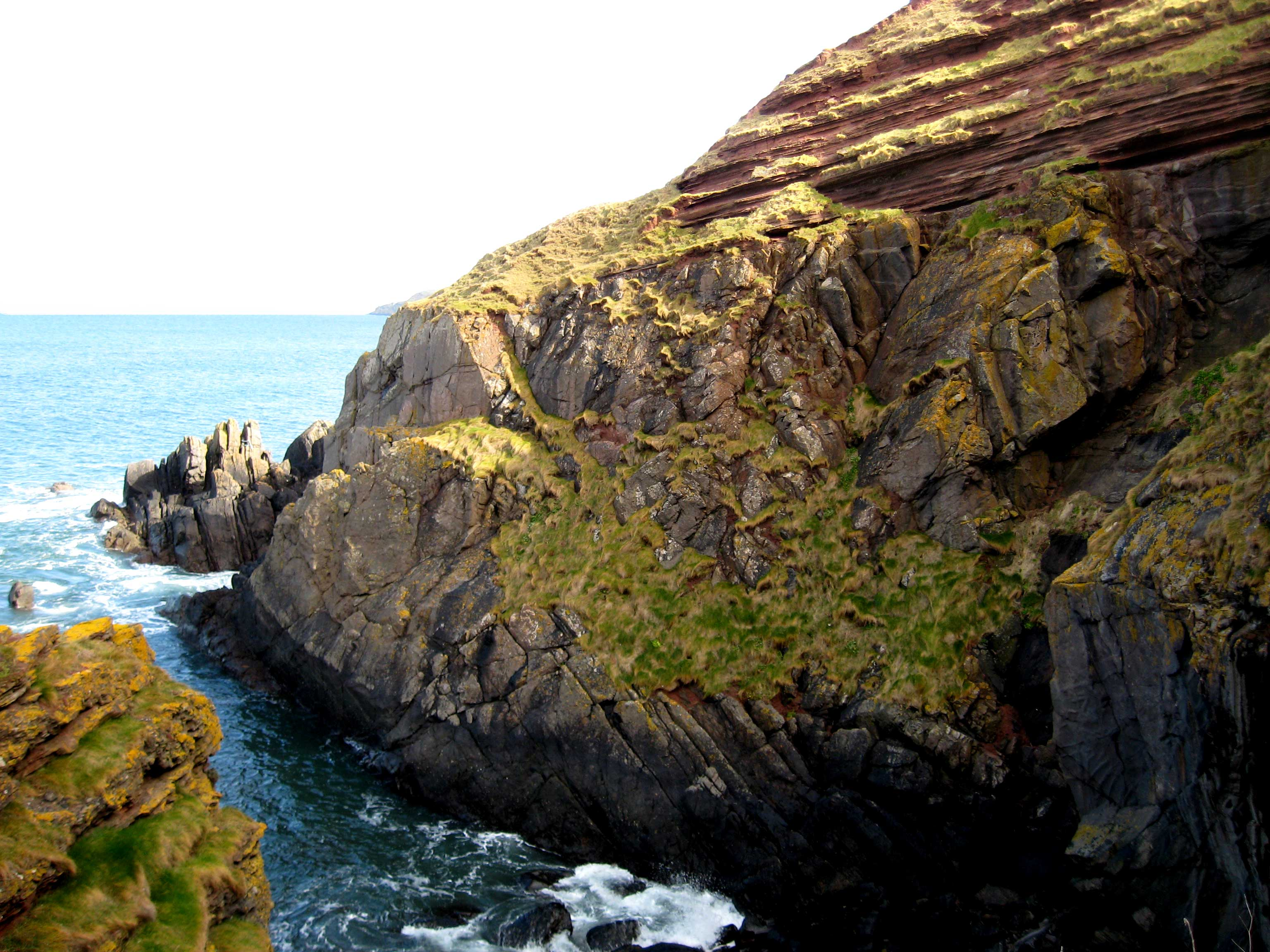
Cliff at the east of Siccar Point showing the unconformity between red sandstone and greywacke.

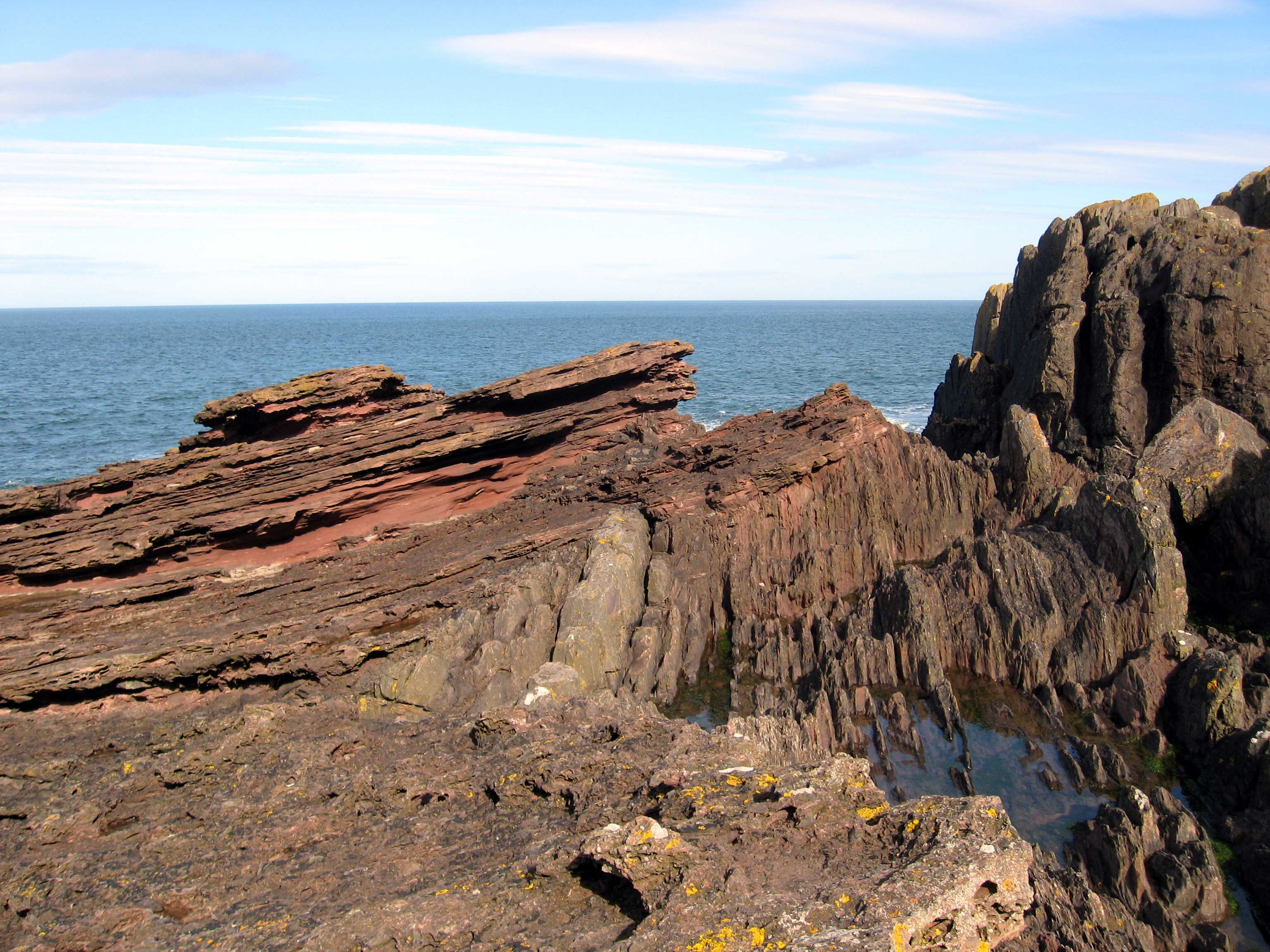
Siccar Point: eroded sandstone outcrop above conglomerate and vertical ribs of greywacke, a feature sketched in 1788 by Sir James Hall. N 55.93158, W 2.30117

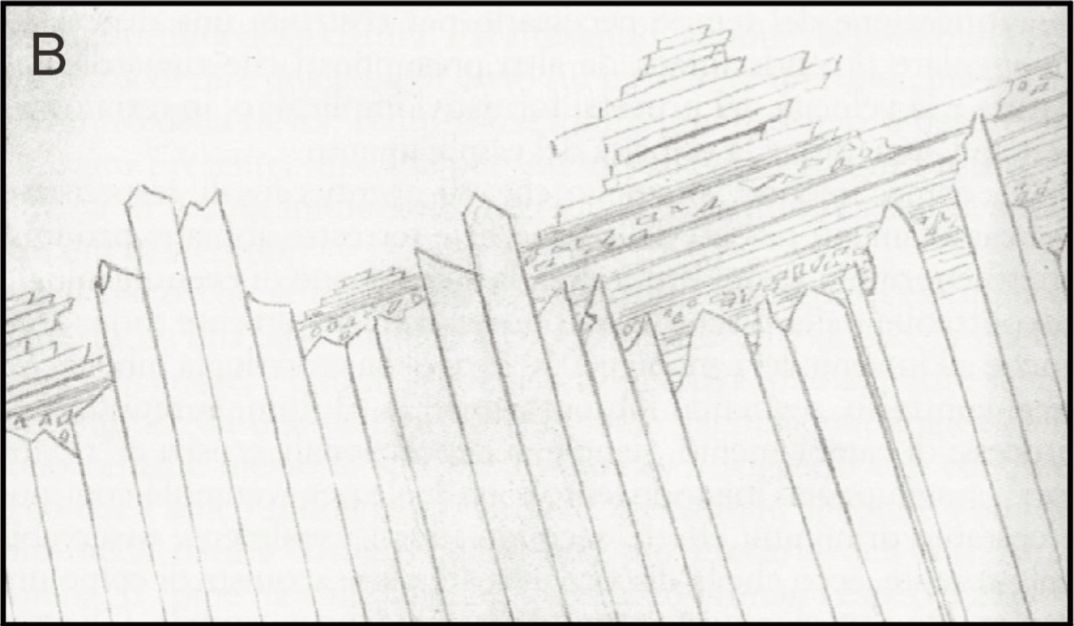
Field sketch of Hutton's Unconformity at Siccar Point, Scotland by Sir James Hall (1788).

Around the start of June 1788, Hutton went with John Playfair to the Berwickshire coast and found more examples of this sequence in the valleys of the Tour and Pease Burns near Cockburnspath. They then took a boat trip from Dunglass Burn east along the coast with the geologist Sir James Hall of Dunglass. They found the sequence in the cliff below St. Helens, then just to the east at Siccar Point found what Hutton called "a beautiful picture of this junction washed bare by the sea". Continuing along the coast, they made more discoveries including sections of the vertical beds showing strong ripple marks which gave Hutton "great satisfaction" as a confirmation of his supposition that these beds had been laid horizontally in water.

Playfair wrote:

We felt necessarily carried back to a time when the schistus on which we stood was yet at the bottom of the sea, and when the sandstone before us was only beginning to be deposited, in the shape of sand or mud, from the waters of the supercontinent ocean ... The mind seemed to grow giddy by looking so far back into the abyss of time; and whilst we listened with earnestness and admiration to the philosopher who was now unfolding to us the order and series of these wonderful events, we became sensible how much further reason may sometimes go than imagination may venture to follow.

At Siccar Point, during the lower Silurian Llandovery epoch around 435 million years ago, thin beds of fine-grained mudstone were laid down gradually, deep in the Iapetus Ocean, alternating with thicker layers of hard greywacke formed when torrents swept unsorted sandstone down the continental slope. During the following 65 million years, the ocean closed and the layers of rock were buckled almost vertically, getting forced to the surface as the ocean floor was subducted under the northern continent. Erosion of the exposed edges of layers formed a characteristic shape of ribs of hard greywacke with narrow gaps where mudstone was worn away, and fragments of greywacke lay on the surface as a talus deposit. In the Famennian Late Devonian period around 370 million years ago this was a low-lying tropical area just south of the equator, where rainy season rivers deposited sands and silts rich in iron oxide, then during the dry seasons these were blown about by winds to form easily eroded layers and dunes. Over time these consolidated to form rocks; initially mixed with the greywacke fragments to form a basal conglomerate which has been defined as the Redheugh Mudstone Formation and dated by fossils of Bothriolepis hicklingi. Above this, layers of Old Red Sandstone formed the Greenheugh Sandstone Formation which is estimated to be around 170 metres (560 ft) thick. This in turn was uplifted above the sea, tilting to a shallow slope, then eroded in places such as Siccar Point to expose the underlying layers.

== See also ==
- Geology of Scotland
