= Siccar Point =

Peninsula in Scottish Borders, Scotland

- Promontory
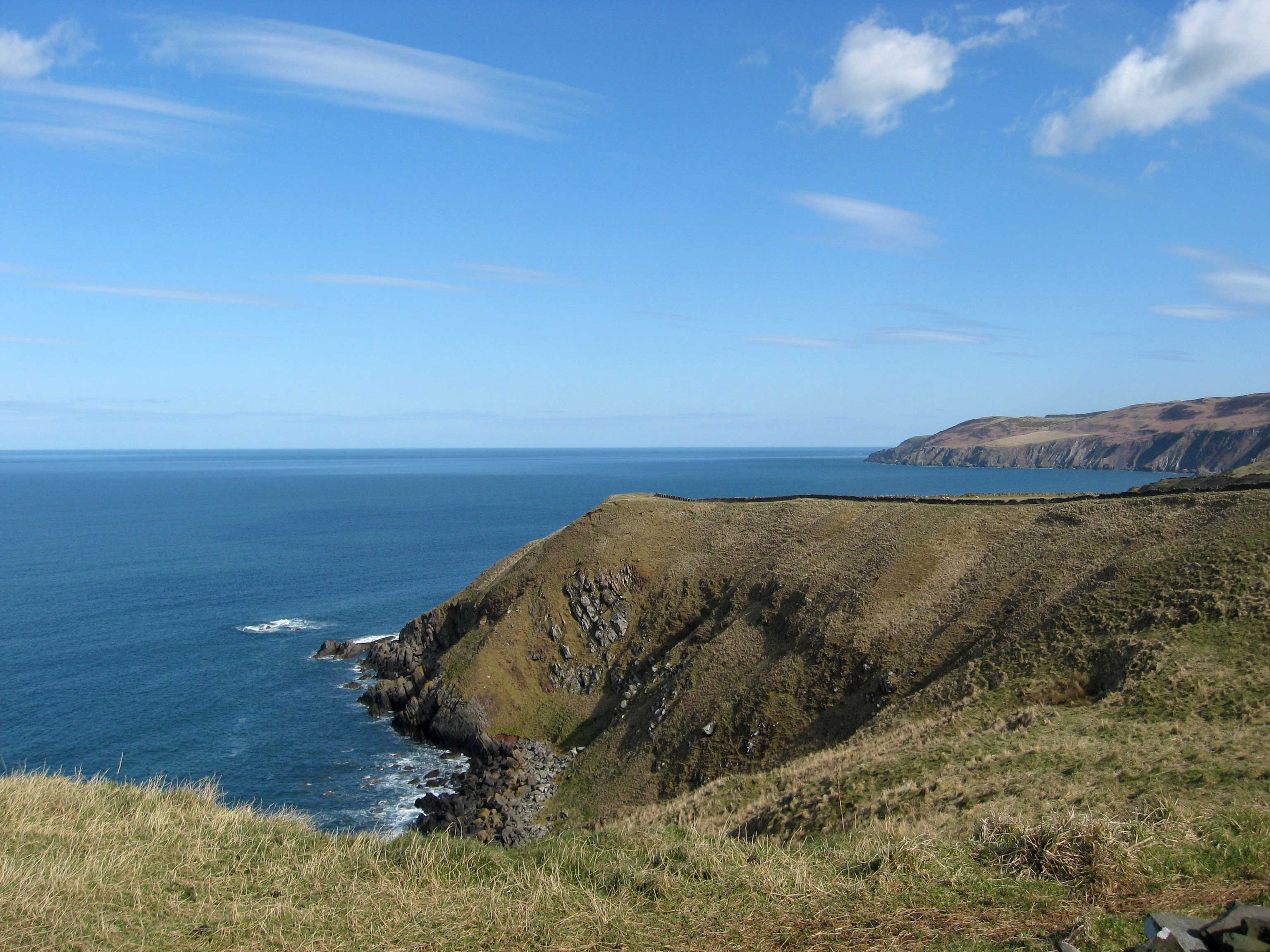
- The point seen from the west

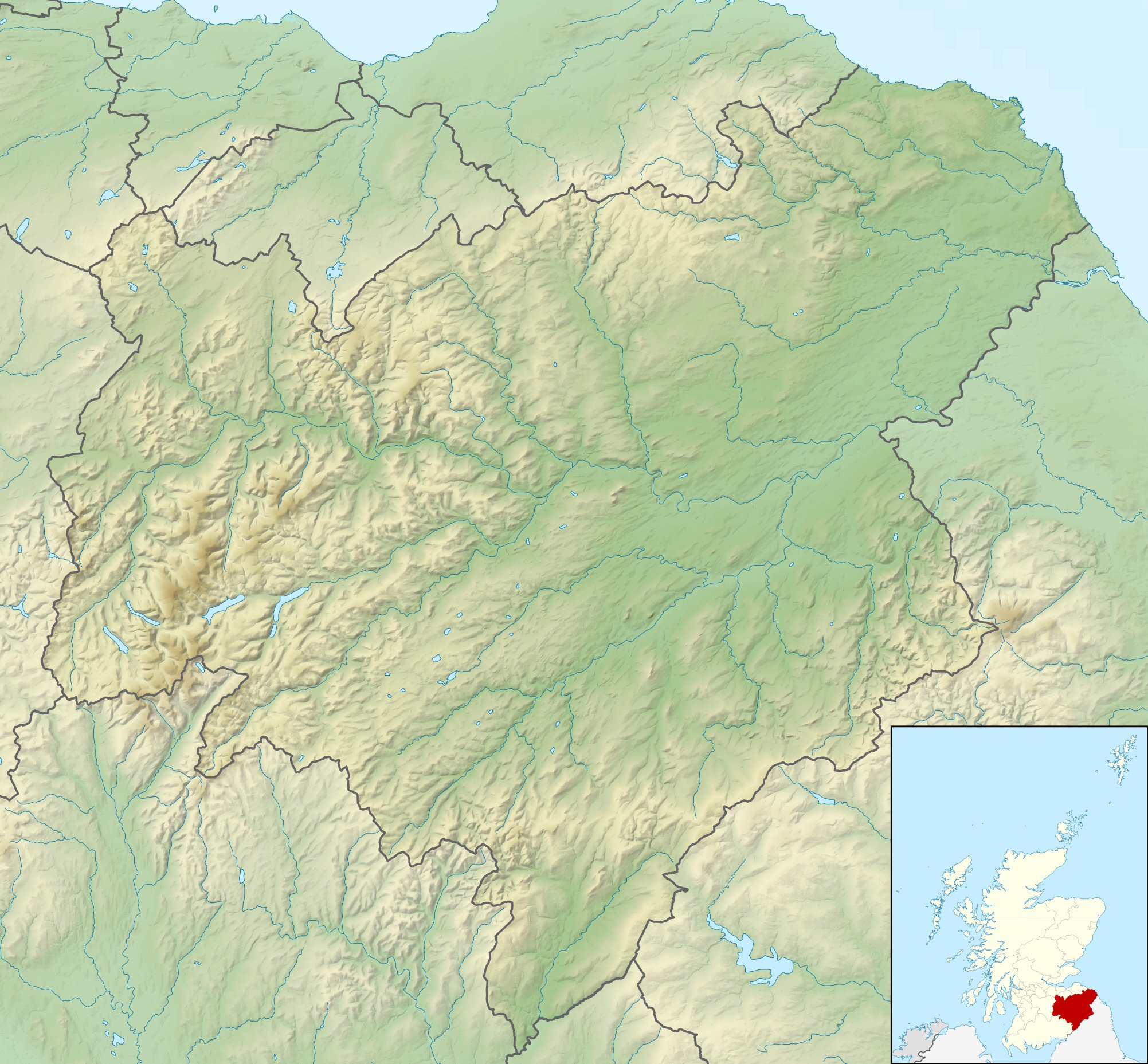
- Location within Scottish Borders
- Coordinates: 55°55′54″N 2°18′04″W
- Grid position: NT812709
- Water bodies: North Sea
- Age: Silurian, Devonian
- Designation: IUGS Geological Heritage Site

Siccar Point is a rocky promontory in the county of Berwickshire on the east coast of Scotland. It is famous in the history of geology for Hutton's Unconformity found in 1788, which James Hutton regarded as conclusive proof of his uniformitarian theory of geological development.

== History ==
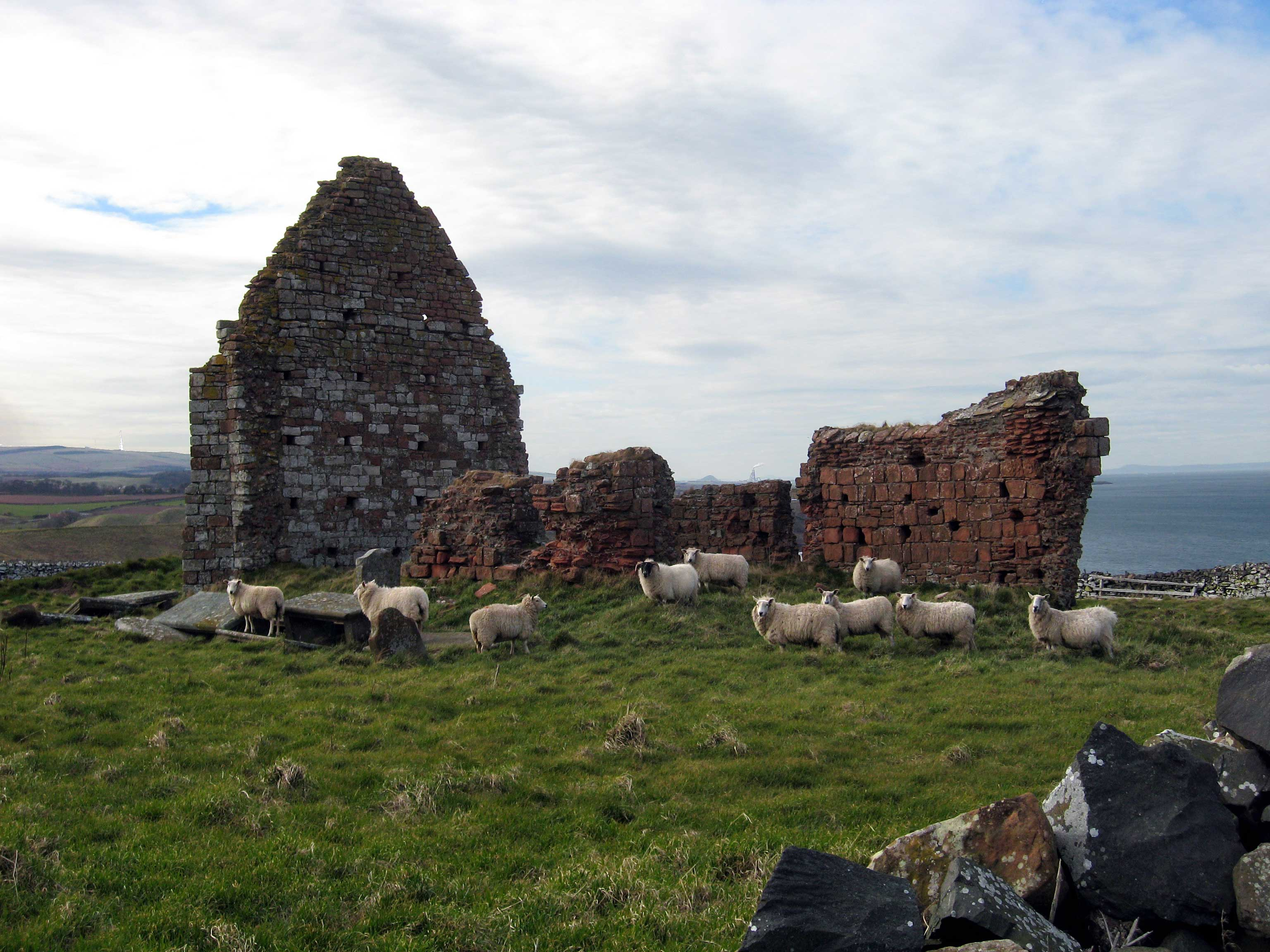
St. Helen's Chapel.

Siccar Point was the site of a dun, or small hill fort, in the territory of the ancient Britons.

Siccar Point is now in the parish of Cockburnspath but was formerly in the parish of Old Cambus, from which the ancient parish church of St Helen's Chapel survives as a ruin about one kilometre to the west of the point. The church is built in a Romanesque style, in a mixture of Old Red Sandstone believed to have been quarried from the nearby Greenheugh Bay and of the greywacke rock also used in the drystone dyke forming the field boundaries. It is likely that the medieval village of Old Cambus was nearer to Siccar Point than the extant hamlet of Old Cambus.

To the south of the point twentieth-century quarrying for greywacke to be used as roadstone left a hollow named Old Cambus Quarry which is now occupied by a vegetable distribution warehouse complex.

== Hutton's Unconformity ==
Siccar Point is notable in the history of geology as a result of a boat trip in 1788 in which geologist James Hutton observed the angular unconformity of the point. He wrote later that the evidence of the rocks provided conclusive proof of the uniformitarian theory of geological development; that is, that the natural laws and processes which operate in the universe have never changed and apply everywhere. In respect for its great importance to the development of geoscience, this locality was included by the International Union of Geological Sciences (IUGS) as the first of 100 global geological heritage sites in a list first published in October 2022.

At the location, near vertical marine sandstones of early Silurian (Llandovery) age (c.440 Ma) are overlain unconformably by gently dipping terrestrial sandstones of late Devonian age (c.375 Ma). The intervening 65 million years represent a time between the tectonic closing of an ocean (the Iapetus Ocean) that had existed between Scotland and England and the building of mountains of a Himalayan scale to the north west. The Silurian sediments were first buried, then lithified into rock, then folded and uplifted and finally eroded to a horizontal surface before being buried by Devonian sediments washed south from the erosion of the mountains. Further tectonic movements later tilted the whole to its current gentle northward dip.

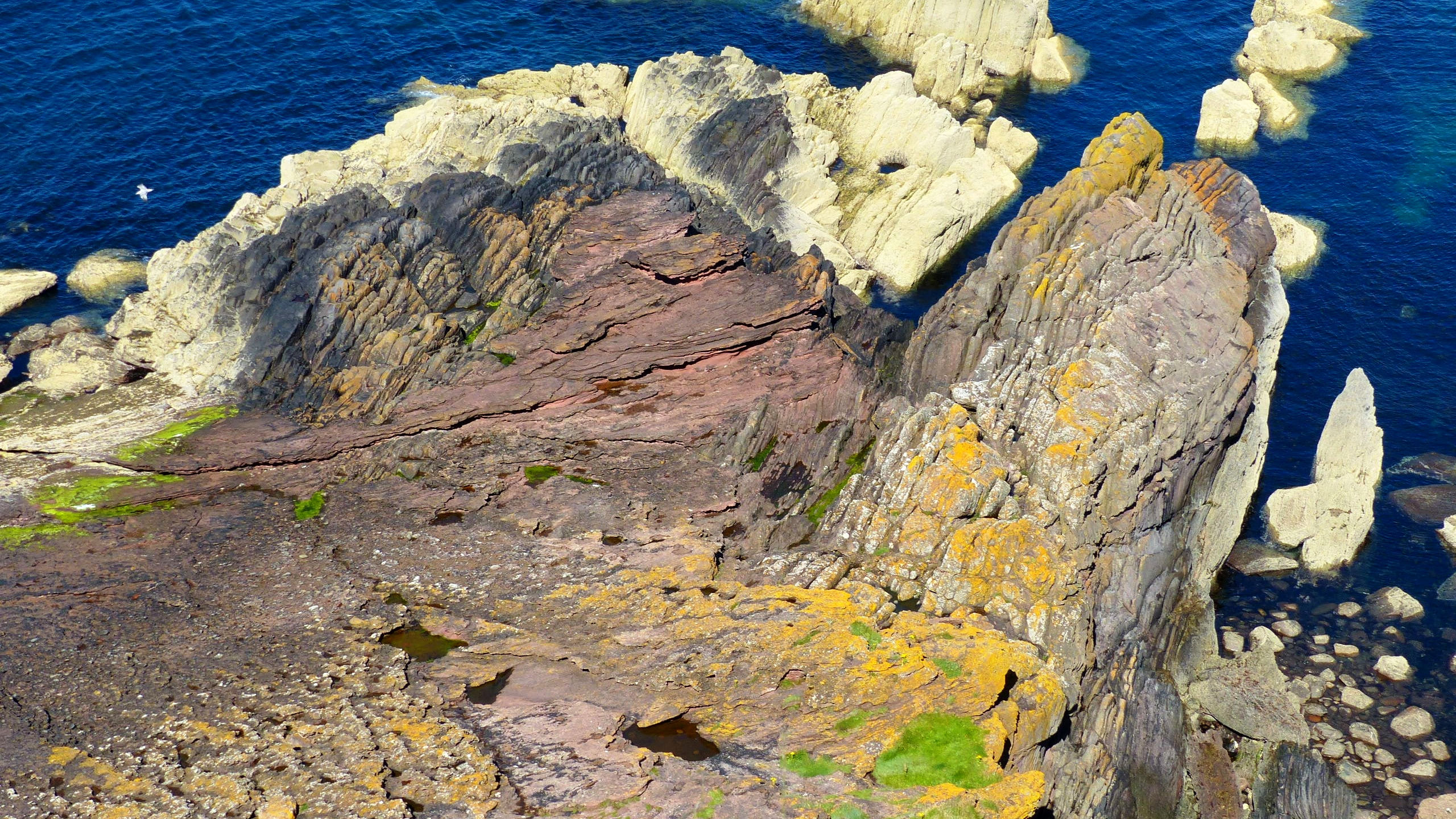
The rugged point, seen from above, shows gently sloping beds of red sandstone above vertical beds of greywacke, forming a classic example of Hutton's Unconformity.

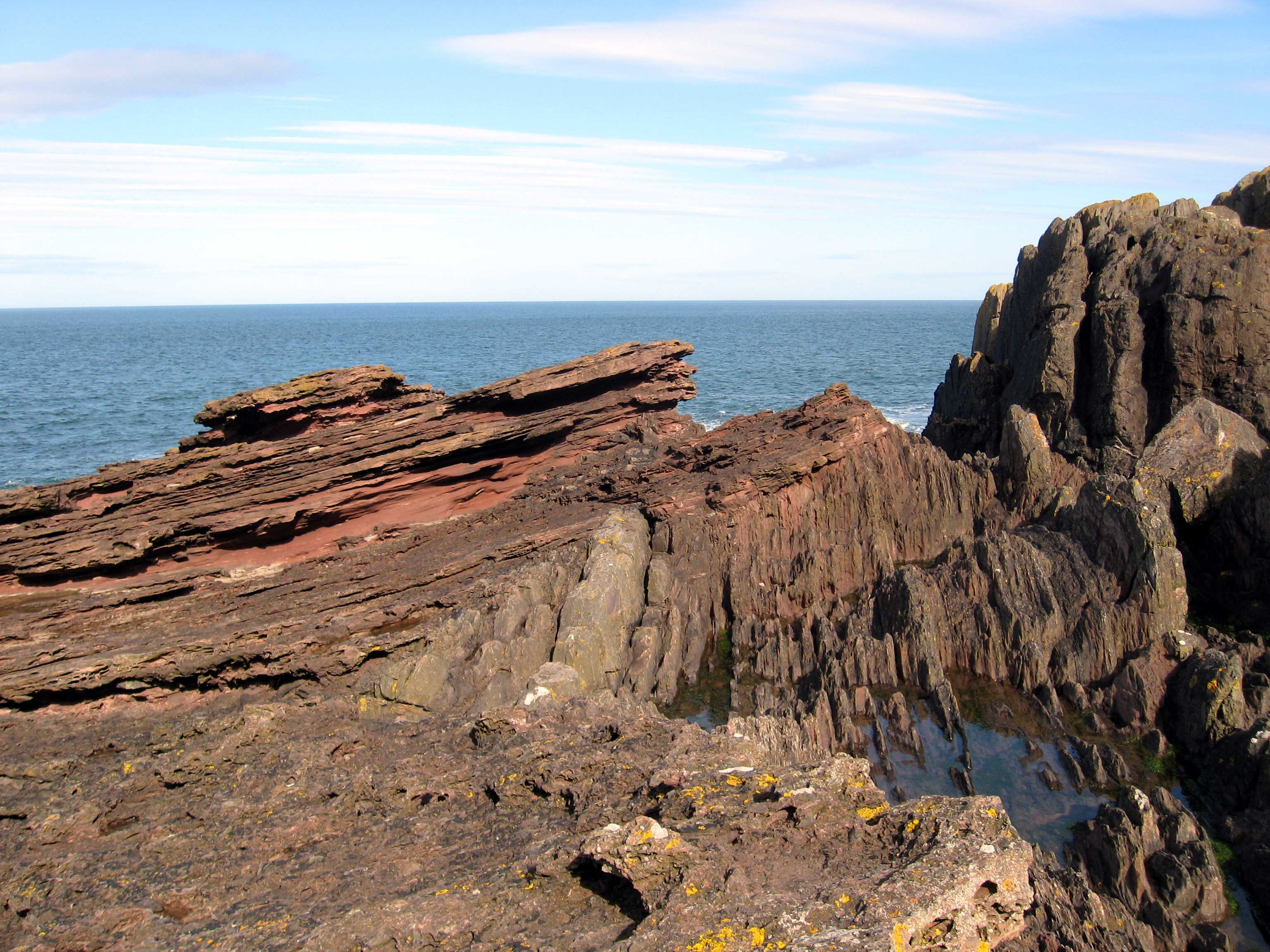
The eroded sandstone outcrop above conglomerate and vertical ribs of greywacke, still much as when sketched in 1788 by Hutton's companion Sir James Hall.

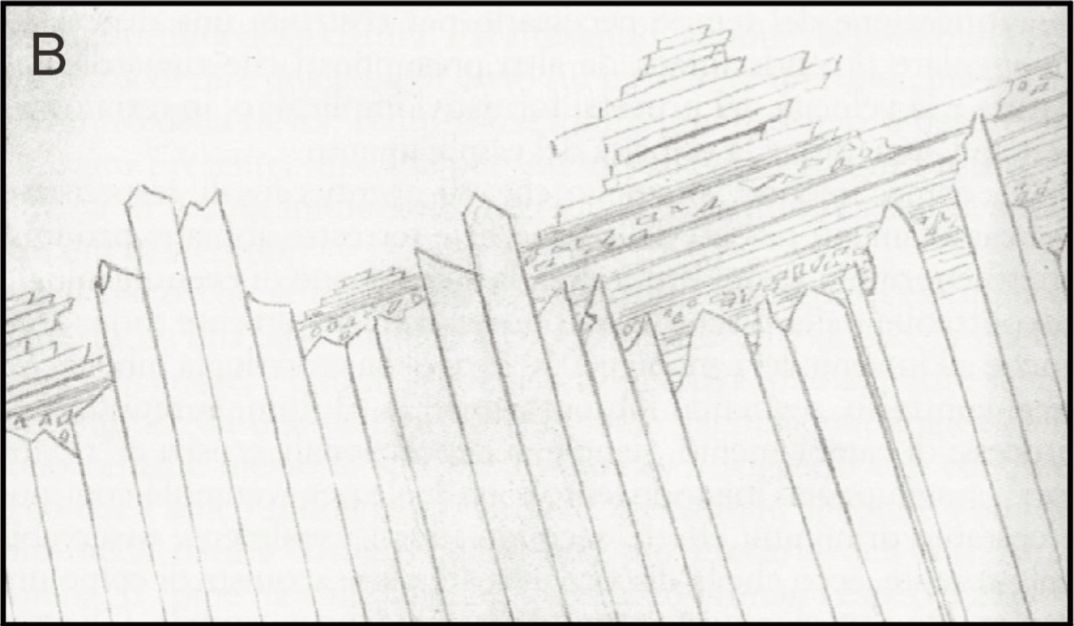
Field sketch of Hutton's Unconformity at Siccar Point, Scotland by Sir James Hall (1788).

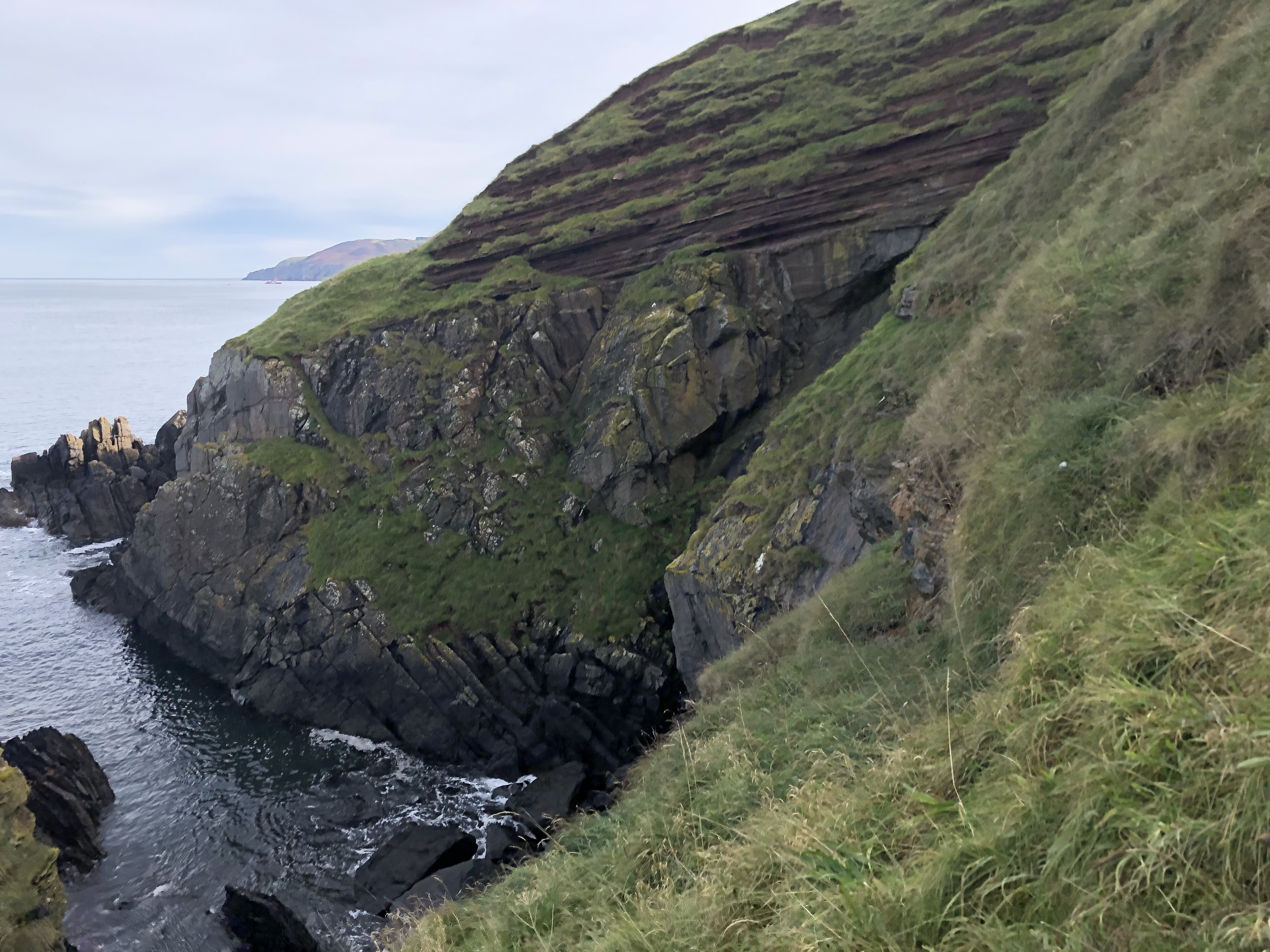
Headlands south of Siccar Point showing tilted strata and unconformities

== See also ==
- List of places in the Scottish Borders
- List of places in Scotland
