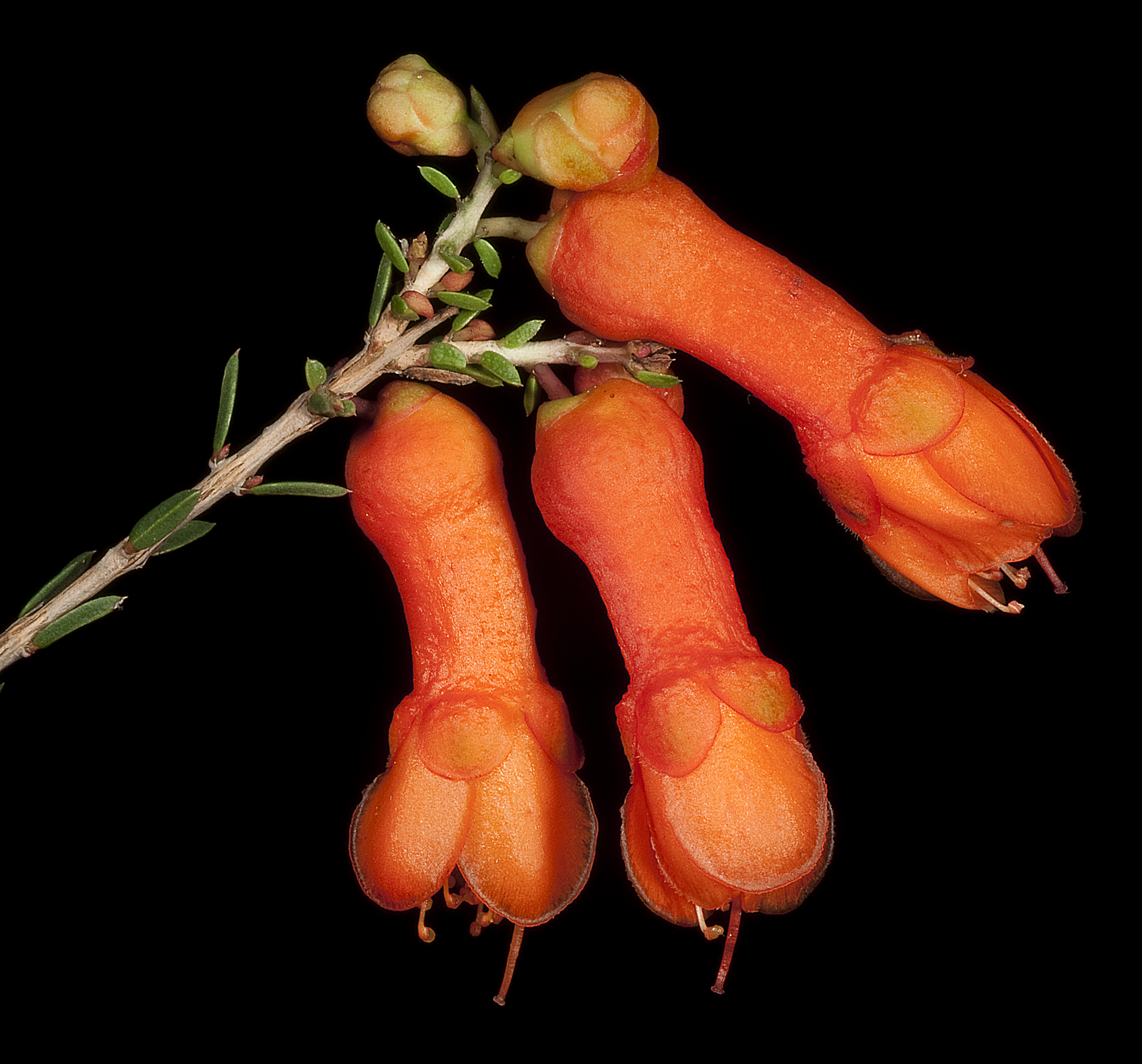

Scientific classification
- Kingdom: Plantae
- Clade: Embryophytes
- Clade: Tracheophytes
- Clade: Angiosperms
- Clade: Eudicots
- Clade: Rosids
- Order: Myrtales
- Family: Myrtaceae
- Genus: Balaustion
- Species: B. pulcherrimum

Binomial name
- Balaustion pulcherrimum Hook.

Synonyms
- Cheynia pulchella Harv.; Punicella carinata Turcz.

= Balaustion pulcherrimum =

Species of flowering plant

Balaustion pulcherrimum, commonly known as native pomegranate, is a species of flowering plant in the family Myrtaceae and is endemic to the south-west of Western Australia. It is prostrate shrub with egg-shaped or narrowly egg-shaped leaves with the narrower end towards the base, and orange or red flowers with 15 to 35 stamens.

== Description ==
Balaustion pulcherrimum is a prostrate shrub 0.2–1.2 m (7.9 in – 3 ft 11.2 in) wide, and often has adventitious roots. Its leaves are egg-shaped to narrowly egg-shaped with the narrower end towards the base, 2.7–6 mm (0.11–0.24 in) long and 1.2–1.5 mm (0.047–0.059 in) wide, the lower surface keeled near the tip with usually two to four rows of oil glands each side of the midvein. The flowers are 15–25 mm (0.59–0.98 in) in diameter on a peduncle 1.5–2.5 mm (0.059–0.098 in) long, each flower on a pedicel 2–4 mm (0.079–0.157 in) long. The floral tube is bell-shaped or cylindrical, 8–20 mm (0.31–0.79 in) long and 6–8 mm (0.24–0.31 in) wide and the sepals are very broadly egg-shaped, 2.5–4 mm (0.098–0.157 in) long, 3.0–6.5 mm (0.12–0.26 in) wide. The petals are orange or red, 7–9 mm (0.28–0.35 in) long, with 15 to 35 stamens. Flowering has been recorded mainly from September to November.

== Taxonomy ==
Balaustion pulcherrimum was first formally described in 19852 by William Jackson Hooker in his Icones Plantarum from specimens collected by James Drummond between the Swan River and King George Sound. The specific epithet (pulcherrimum) means 'very beautiful'.

== Distribution and habitat ==
This species of Balaustion grows in yellow sand on sandplains between Lake Monger, Kirkalocka station and Hyden in the Avon Wheatbelt, Coolgardie, Mallee, Murchison and Yalgoo bioregions in the south-west of Western Australia.

== Conservation status ==
Balaustion pulcherrimum is listed as "not threatened" by the Government of Western Australia Department of Biodiversity, Conservation and Attractions.
