= B. grandis =

B. grandis may refer to:

- Baeckea grandis, a shrub species in the genus Baeckea
- Banksia grandis, the bull banksia, giant banksia or mangite, a common and distinctive tree species found in South West Western Australia
- Beishanlong grandis, a giant ornithomimosaurian dinosaur from the Early Cretaceous of China
- Boehmeria grandis, a flowering plant species in the genus Boehmeria
- Buchenavia grandis, a plant species in the genus Buchenavia

== See also ==
- Grandis (disambiguation)
