= List of homesteads in Western Australia: K =

This list includes all homesteads in Western Australia with a gazetted name. It is complete with respect to the 1996 Gazetteer of Australia. Dubious names have been checked against the online 2004 data, and in all cases confirmed correct. However, if any homesteads have been gazetted or deleted since 1996, this list does not reflect these changes. Strictly speaking, Australian place names are gazetted in capital letters only; the names in this list have been converted to mixed case in accordance with normal capitalisation conventions.

Name	Location	Remarks
Kaburnie	28°39′S 115°28′E	
Kachana	33°51′S 115°8′E	
Kainton	33°26′S 121°40′E	
Kalabity Moorna	33°38′S 121°48′E	
Kalagan	33°35′S 117°41′E	
Kalaitha	33°59′S 118°0′E	
Kalang	33°35′S 117°28′E	
Kalaroo	32°24′S 117°22′E	
Kalaroo	33°33′S 117°8′E	
Kalbanya	32°16′S 118°29′E	
Kalgan Downs	34°36′S 117°59′E	
Kalgan Downs	34°36′S 118°1′E	
Kallaroo	30°30′S 116°8′E	
Kalli	26°54′S 117°7′E	
Kalmeter	32°23′S 117°25′E	
Kaloyari	29°58′S 115°9′E	
Kaludabah	33°31′S 116°36′E	
Kalumbar Park	30°1′S 116°17′E	
Kaluwiri	27°41′S 120°5′E	
Kalwinyarna	34°49′S 117°58′E	
Kalyan	34°33′S 117°28′E	
Kalyeeda	18°32′S 124°43′E	
Kamballan	33°38′S 116°26′E	
Kamondee Farm	34°59′S 117°2′E	
Kana Downs	33°30′S 120°44′E	
Kanandah	30°54′S 124°52′E	
Kanangra	34°19′S 116°40′E	
Kanangra	33°37′S 115°55′E	
Kandalee	33°55′S 116°0′E	
Kangan	21°6′S 118°31′E	
Kangarabbi	34°42′S 117°49′E	
Kanjenjie Outstation	21°41′S 117°18′E	
Kanooka	33°45′S 117°22′E	
Kanowna	30°30′S 121°25′E	
Kappi Ki	33°19′S 120°58′E	
Kapunda	33°31′S 117°41′E	
Karabine	31°45′S 116°49′E	
Karak Park	33°13′S 120°4′E	
Karalta	30°42′S 115°42′E	
Karalundi	26°8′S 118°41′E	
Karana	33°50′S 116°48′E	
Karanja	28°43′S 114°51′E	
Karara	29°14′S 116°43′E	
Karatangi	34°54′S 117°52′E	
Karawine	33°52′S 117°57′E	
Karbar	27°5′S 118°0′E	
Kareela	34°21′S 117°29′E	
Kareelah	34°33′S 118°25′E	
Kareelah	28°45′S 115°10′E	
Kareelan	34°3′S 118°26′E	
Karendale	34°23′S 117°13′E	
Karendale	33°45′S 115°3′E	
Karenvale	33°40′S 119°22′E	
Karinda	33°28′S 116°7′E	
Karinella Farms	31°17′S 116°48′E	
Karinga	33°39′S 115°46′E	
Karinga	31°17′S 116°6′E	
Karinga	30°38′S 115°16′E	
Karinga Park	33°50′S 116°43′E	
Karingal	33°25′S 121°37′E	
Karingal	32°56′S 117°48′E	
Karingal	33°52′S 118°12′E	
Karinya	33°16′S 115°48′E	
Karinya	29°17′S 116°8′E	
Karinya	33°9′S 116°51′E	
Karinya Park	31°4′S 115°48′E	
Karkawarri	34°44′S 117°20′E	
Karlgarin Hill	32°30′S 118°32′E	
Karloning	30°38′S 118°9′E	
Karrabein	31°32′S 116°54′E	
Karrakin	31°50′S 117°24′E	
Karralea	34°54′S 118°5′E	
Karratha	20°53′S 116°40′E	
Karribank	34°39′S 117°53′E	
Karridale Estate	34°11′S 115°5′E	
Karriup	34°56′S 117°23′E	
Karriview	33°52′S 115°1′E	
Kartanarra	32°6′S 117°20′E	
Karyrie	33°45′S 122°36′E	
Kasvin	32°56′S 117°27′E	
Katandra	33°32′S 116°37′E	
Kawana	30°20′S 118°52′E	
Kaynaba	30°40′S 115°44′E	
Keaysdale	34°50′S 117°57′E	
Kedson Vale	34°14′S 118°56′E	
Keelocking	32°28′S 116°58′E	
Keelocking South	34°35′S 118°16′E	
Keiarra	34°42′S 117°36′E	
Kellara	34°34′S 117°28′E	
Kelmbrae	33°34′S 121°22′E	
Kelmore	28°41′S 115°19′E	
Kelstern	29°40′S 116°12′E	
Kelverton Farm	32°19′S 116°1′E	
Kelvin Grove	34°0′S 117°34′E	
Kelvingrove	33°11′S 119°7′E	
Kemminup	33°46′S 117°14′E	
Kendale	34°19′S 117°37′E	
Kendalup	31°23′S 115°54′E	
Kendle Grove	33°57′S 117°23′E	
Kengerrup	33°59′S 117°10′E	
Kenilworth	32°27′S 116°50′E	
Keninup	33°56′S 116°34′E	
Kenkarri	34°34′S 117°0′E	
Kenley	33°10′S 116°53′E	
Kennedys Cottage	17°45′S 122°12′E	
Kenrich	33°15′S 115°49′E	
Kensey Park	33°38′S 119°22′E	
Kensham	31°35′S 116°26′E	
Kensington	32°38′S 115°41′E	
Kentmont Downs	33°36′S 121°46′E	
Kentrevay	32°26′S 117°33′E	
Kentuckey	31°45′S 116°36′E	
Kentucky	33°39′S 115°35′E	
Kenvell	33°44′S 116°29′E	
Kenwyn	33°41′S 115°14′E	
Keoringle	34°2′S 115°12′E	
Keoringle	29°56′S 115°12′E	
Kerangvale	33°50′S 117°39′E	
Kerepei	33°25′S 117°0′E	
Kerida	33°41′S 115°15′E	
Keringal	34°53′S 118°1′E	
Keriroca	33°31′S 115°43′E	
Kerriley Park	33°43′S 115°7′E	
Kerrydale	33°6′S 118°51′E	
Keswick	34°9′S 117°32′E	
Kettle Rock	32°17′S 116°33′E	
Ketts	33°34′S 117°24′E	
Kewarra	33°51′S 118°14′E	
Key Farm	31°35′S 116°28′E	
Kia-ora	30°40′S 116°2′E	
Kia-ora	33°49′S 117°31′E	
Kia-ora	33°10′S 116°56′E	
Kiah	34°59′S 117°38′E	
Kiamunjie	34°35′S 118°35′E	
Kiaora	32°24′S 117°13′E	
Kiddys Well	33°55′S 118°1′E	
Kiearra	32°30′S 116°49′E	
Kilarney	33°34′S 115°58′E	
Kilbride	30°51′S 115°42′E	
Kilburnie	33°54′S 117°26′E	
Kilima	33°36′S 118°0′E	
Killara	34°27′S 118°40′E	
Killara	26°21′S 118°57′E	
Killara	31°39′S 116°4′E	
Killara	33°48′S 118°56′E	
Killarney	34°28′S 117°2′E	
Killarney	33°17′S 115°48′E	
Killarney	34°55′S 117°58′E	
Killawarra	29°31′S 116°3′E	
Killawarra	31°33′S 116°5′E	
Killcodey	31°40′S 116°4′E	
Killeen	33°57′S 117°26′E	
Killesby	34°8′S 118°16′E	
Killey Moon	31°29′S 115°54′E	
Killmore	34°28′S 117°42′E	
Killoggy	34°27′S 117°17′E	
Kilmaurs	33°14′S 119°14′E	
Kilto	17°42′S 122°43′E	
Kimbarra Downs	33°40′S 122°0′E	
Kimberley Downs	17°24′S 124°21′E	
Kimbolton	16°41′S 123°50′E	
Kin Kin	34°23′S 116°19′E	
Kinclaven	30°52′S 125°31′E	
King Creek	34°55′S 118°12′E	
King Edward River	15°23′S 126°19′E	
King Ranch	29°59′S 115°7′E	
King Rock	32°17′S 119°8′E	
Kingfield	33°1′S 119°52′E	
Kinghurst	34°1′S 116°49′E	
Kings	31°19′S 115°44′E	
Kingscote Lodge	33°47′S 115°59′E	
Kingsholme	33°34′S 115°4′E	
Kingsley Downs	33°55′S 116°16′E	
Kingston Park	31°35′S 116°44′E	
Kingsville	33°52′S 118°48′E	
Kinkora	28°37′S 115°30′E	
Kinnabulla	34°42′S 118°17′E	
Kinnaird	32°34′S 117°43′E	
Kinross	33°47′S 117°19′E	
Kinta	34°12′S 118°34′E	
Kintail Park	33°56′S 118°57′E	
Kintyre	33°38′S 122°11′E	
Kinyorra	29°27′S 115°56′E	
Kiola	32°47′S 117°22′E	
Kiramia	31°0′S 116°20′E	
Kirgella Rocks	30°4′S 122°53′E	
Kiriwina	34°39′S 117°46′E	
Kirkalocka	28°34′S 117°47′E	
Kirra	33°20′S 119°0′E	
Kitchcoolie	31°21′S 116°54′E	
Klazina	34°14′S 118°4′E	
Knowle Hill	34°28′S 117°29′E	
Koetong	35°0′S 117°33′E	
Kogody	33°41′S 121°42′E	
Kohat	33°25′S 117°7′E	
Kohat	33°11′S 117°6′E	
Kohlbardi	33°53′S 118°55′E	
Kojaneerup	34°29′S 118°17′E	
Kojannup	33°7′S 115°51′E	
Kojonolokan Hills	33°30′S 117°19′E	
Kokarrup	33°20′S 117°2′E	
Kolbardy	32°56′S 117°50′E	
Kolburn	30°37′S 115°51′E	
Kolindale	32°43′S 117°51′E	
Konamauri	33°40′S 122°33′E	
Koobabbie	29°56′S 116°12′E	
Koobelup	33°41′S 117°41′E	
Koojan Downs	30°50′S 115°55′E	
Kookaburra Farm	34°53′S 117°19′E	
Kookaro	34°19′S 116°54′E	
Kookynie	29°20′S 121°30′E	
Koolbardi	34°41′S 117°50′E	
Koolbunine	31°42′S 116°59′E	
Kooldesak	29°20′S 116°23′E	
Koolinda	33°41′S 116°37′E	
Koolinda-vale	33°44′S 116°49′E	
Kooline	22°55′S 116°17′E	
Koolunga Vale	33°39′S 121°22′E	
Koombana Park	33°18′S 115°45′E	
Koombekine	31°5′S 117°0′E	
Koonalda	34°39′S 117°45′E	
Koongie Park	18°20′S 127°32′E	
Koongleying	32°9′S 116°57′E	
Koonje	34°25′S 117°25′E	
Koonje North	34°22′S 117°25′E	
Koonmarra	26°17′S 117°47′E	
Koonya	30°31′S 116°5′E	
Koordarrie	22°18′S 115°2′E	
Koorian	31°18′S 115°53′E	
Koorikin	32°28′S 118°9′E	
Kooringa	33°43′S 117°30′E	
Kooringa	30°27′S 116°4′E	
Kooringa	33°45′S 117°36′E	
Kooringa	33°55′S 118°17′E	
Kooringa	30°3′S 115°13′E	
Kooringal	33°47′S 120°13′E	
Kooringal	32°22′S 117°19′E	
Koornong	32°22′S 117°1′E	
Kooroocheang	33°18′S 115°47′E	
Kooyong	34°2′S 118°4′E	
Koppio Downs	33°35′S 121°45′E	
Koranga	29°3′S 115°10′E	
Korgitdale	30°31′S 116°1′E	
Korong	28°37′S 122°0′E	
Korong Park	33°2′S 115°44′E	
Korong Vale	33°56′S 117°17′E	
Korrawilla	31°57′S 116°59′E	
Korrinup	33°51′S 117°11′E	
Kroehut	31°20′S 116°41′E	
Kualadale	34°3′S 117°5′E	
Kubbine	32°32′S 116°49′E	
Kuibrook	33°41′S 119°39′E	
Kukerin Soak	33°1′S 118°4′E	
Kulana	32°40′S 118°14′E	
Kuleeran	33°34′S 121°16′E	
Kulinban	29°54′S 116°23′E	
Kuliup	33°26′S 119°27′E	
Kulki	33°43′S 117°37′E	
Kuloomba	33°45′S 122°59′E	
Kulyallin	34°37′S 118°24′E	
Kumarina	24°42′S 119°36′E	
Kunine	31°38′S 116°41′E	
Kunjarra	33°34′S 118°29′E	
Kunmallup	33°35′S 117°10′E	
Kunmarnara Bore	26°18′S 128°27′E	
Kuranda	33°22′S 117°6′E	
Kuranda	34°35′S 118°8′E	
Kuringai	31°18′S 115°38′E	
Kuringai	34°58′S 118°2′E	
Kuringai	33°54′S 116°24′E	
Kurra Spring	31°10′S 115°54′E	
Kurrabi	34°50′S 117°51′E	
Kurrajong Outcamp	29°16′S 120°37′E	
Kurrara Park	33°6′S 117°24′E	
Kurrenkutten	32°13′S 118°13′E	
Kurrenkutten Park	32°14′S 118°5′E	
Kurrumboola	33°42′S 122°2′E	
Kwinana	33°49′S 117°41′E	
Kwornicup	34°34′S 117°25′E	
Kyarra Park	31°21′S 116°8′E	
Kybelup	34°24′S 117°12′E	
Kybo	31°2′S 126°35′E	
Kyby Downs	33°42′S 120°43′E	
Kyeema	33°33′S 115°38′E	
Kyeema	34°2′S 118°49′E	
Kyewong	33°31′S 115°38′E	
Kyewong	34°49′S 118°13′E	
Kylietharra Outcamp	24°55′S 115°16′E	
Kyltorran	33°34′S 119°32′E	
Kyno	30°39′S 115°42′E	
Kynterne	33°29′S 117°20′E	
Kyrahmi	32°47′S 117°2′E	
Kyramup	34°3′S 117°47′E	
Kywong	33°33′S 119°56′E	
Kywonga	34°50′S 117°48′E	

== See also ==
- List of pastoral leases in Western Australia
