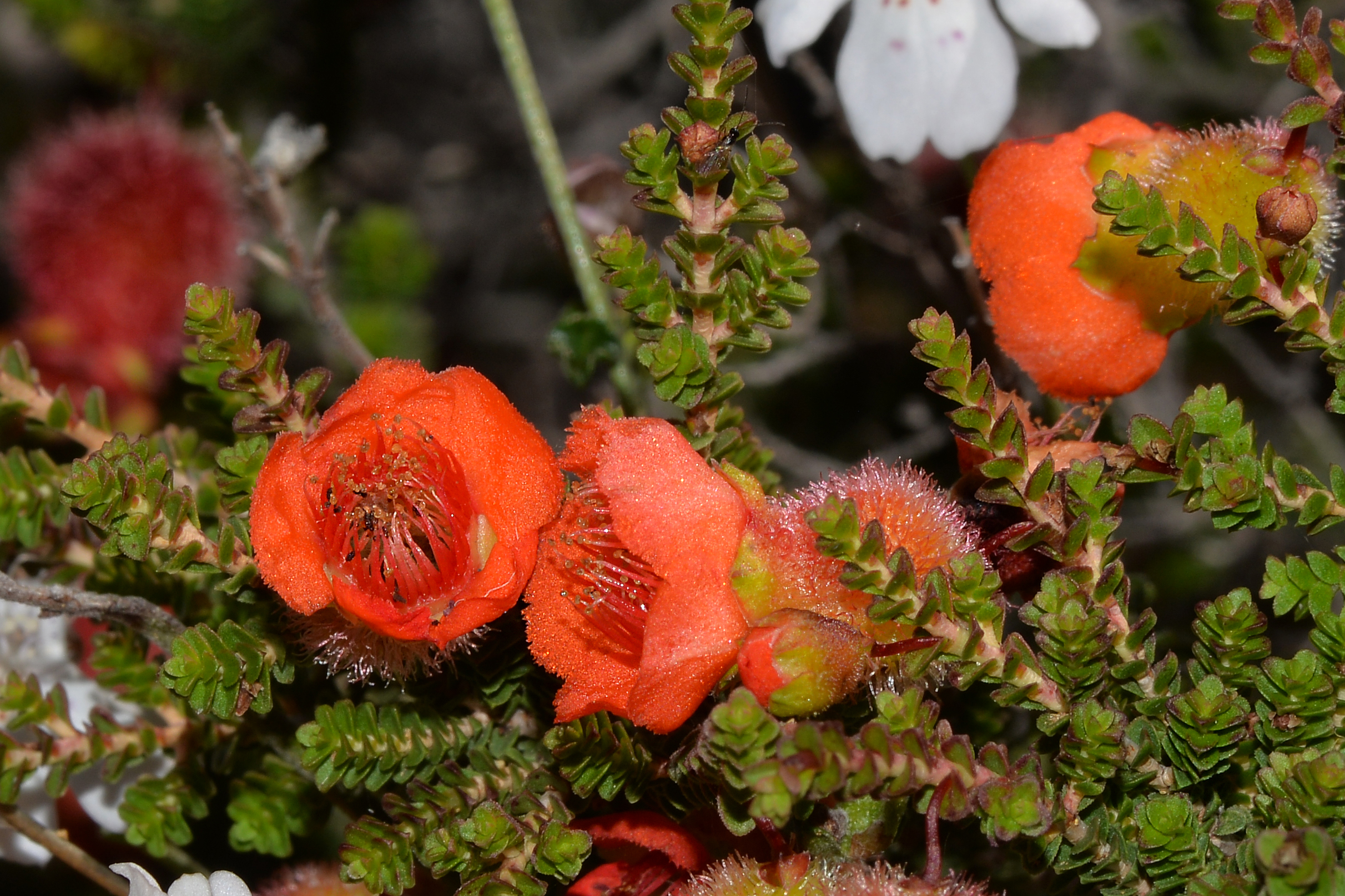

Scientific classification
- Kingdom: Plantae
- Clade: Tracheophytes
- Clade: Angiosperms
- Clade: Eudicots
- Clade: Rosids
- Order: Myrtales
- Family: Myrtaceae
- Genus: Cheyniana
- Species: C. microphylla

Binomial name
- Cheyniana microphylla (C.A.Gardner) Rye

= Cheyniana microphylla =

Species of flowering plant

Cheyniana microphylla (common name bush pomegranate) is a plant in the family Myrtaceae which is endemic to Western Australia.

It was first described in 1928 by Charles Gardner as Balaustion microphyllum, but was redescribed in 2009 by Barbara Rye as Cheyniana microphylla, when she narrowed the circumscription of Balaustion and described the new genus, Cheyniana.

== Conservation status ==
It is considered to be "not threatened".
