= Teakle =

Teakle is a surname. Notable people with the surname include:

- Brynn Teakle (born 1999), Australian footballer
- Hartley Teakle (1901–1979), Australian agriculturalist
- Julia Teakle (born 2003), Australian footballer
