= Beringbooding Rock =

Granite rock formation in Western Australia

Coordinates: 30°33′33″S 118°29′38″E

Beringbooding Rock is a granite rock formation located approximately 65 km (40 mi) north east of Mukinbudin in the eastern Wheatbelt region of Western Australia.

The site features a large balancing boulder, a large gnamma hole and paintings of the Kalamaia people's hands in a cave at the rear of the rock. There is also a camping site facilities including picnic tables, fire pits and a toilet.

Like other granite outcrops found in the Wheatbelt, Beringbooding displays the different forms of weathering from water and wind. A large vertical rock face is beginning to take the shape of a wave formation, caused by the same weathering patterns that created Wave Rock.

The 18-acre (7.3 ha) rock is used to collect water for the largest rock water catchment tank in Australia, holding around 2,250,000 imp gal (10,200,000 L; 2,700,000 US gal) of water. The tank was built in 1937 using sustenance labour at a cost of £10,000. Two early pioneer wells are also found nearby.

The area was known to Aboriginal Australians as a reliable water source. Following European settlement prior to 1902 the wells near the rock were equipped with pumps in 1929 as part of the 3500 Farms Scheme to increase the number of settlers in the area.

Surveys of Beringbooding were completed in 1936 to build a large scale water holding facility. Water is channelled from the rock surface catchment using a wall around the edge of the rock. It then flows into an aqueduct and fills the tank during rain events. A roof was installed to minimise water loss through evaporation.

Vegetation surrounding the rock includes Leptospermum erubescens, Eucalyptus websteriana, Kunzea pulchella, as well as species of Melaleuca, Acacia, Grevillea, Hakea, Calothamnus, quandongs, sandalwood and native orchids which support a variety of bird life. The area is also home to the Günther's toadlet.

== See also ==
- Granite outcrops of Western Australia
