= Balaustion filifolium =

Conservation status
- Priority Two — Poorly Known Taxa (DEC)

Scientific classification
- Kingdom: Plantae
- Clade: Tracheophytes
- Clade: Angiosperms
- Clade: Eudicots
- Clade: Rosids
- Order: Myrtales
- Family: Myrtaceae
- Genus: Balaustion
- Species: B. filifolium

Binomial name
- Balaustion filifolium Rye

Species of flowering plant

Balaustion filifolium is a species of flowering plant in the family Myrtaceae and is endemic to inland Western Australia. It is a prostrate or low-growing shrub with narrowly egg-shaped to linear leaves with a small point on the end, and pale pink flowers with 16 to 24 stamens.

== Description ==
Balaustion filifolium is a prostrate or low-growing shrub that typically grows to 20–50 cm (7.9–19.7 in) high and 0.5–1.4 m (1 ft 8 in – 4 ft 7 in) wide. Its leaves are arranged in dense clusters, sometimes pressed against the stems, mostly narrowly triangular to linear, 3–7 mm (0.12–0.28 in) long 0.2–0.3 mm (0.0079–0.0118 in) wide and 0.2–0.3 mm (0.0079–0.0118 in) thick on a petiole 0.1–0.2 mm (0.0039–0.0079 in) long. The leaves have a small, hard tip on the end and one or two rows of oil glands either side of the midvein. The flowers are 9–13 mm (0.35–0.51 in) in diameter, each flower on a pedicel 2.0–3.5 mm (0.079–0.138 in) long. The floral tube is more or less hemispherical, 1.5–2.0 mm (0.059–0.079 in) long and 3–4 mm (0.12–0.16 in) wide and the sepals are egg-shaped, 1.2–1.8 mm (0.047–0.071 in) long and 2.0–2.5 mm (0.079–0.098 in) wide with a red tinge. The petals are pale pink, 4–5 mm (0.16–0.20 in) long with 16 to 24 stamens. Flowering has been recorded from August to October, and the fruit is a capsule 2.5–3.5 mm (0.098–0.138 in) long and 3–4 mm (0.12–0.16 in) in diameter.

== Taxonomy ==
Balaustion filifolium was first formally described in 2022 by Barbara Lynette Rye in the journal Nuytsia from specimens collected near Beringbooding in 1957. The specific epithet (filifolium) means 'thread-leaved'.

== Distribution and habitat ==
This species of Balaustion has been recorded on sand plains and near granite outcrops from Beringbooding Rock to west of Mukinbudin in the Avon Wheatbelt and Coolgardie bioregions, and is usually recorded growing with Acacia species.

== Conservation status ==
Balaustion filifolium is listed as "Priority Two" by the Western Australian Government Department of Biodiversity, Conservation and Attractions, meaning that it is poorly known and from only one or a few locations.
