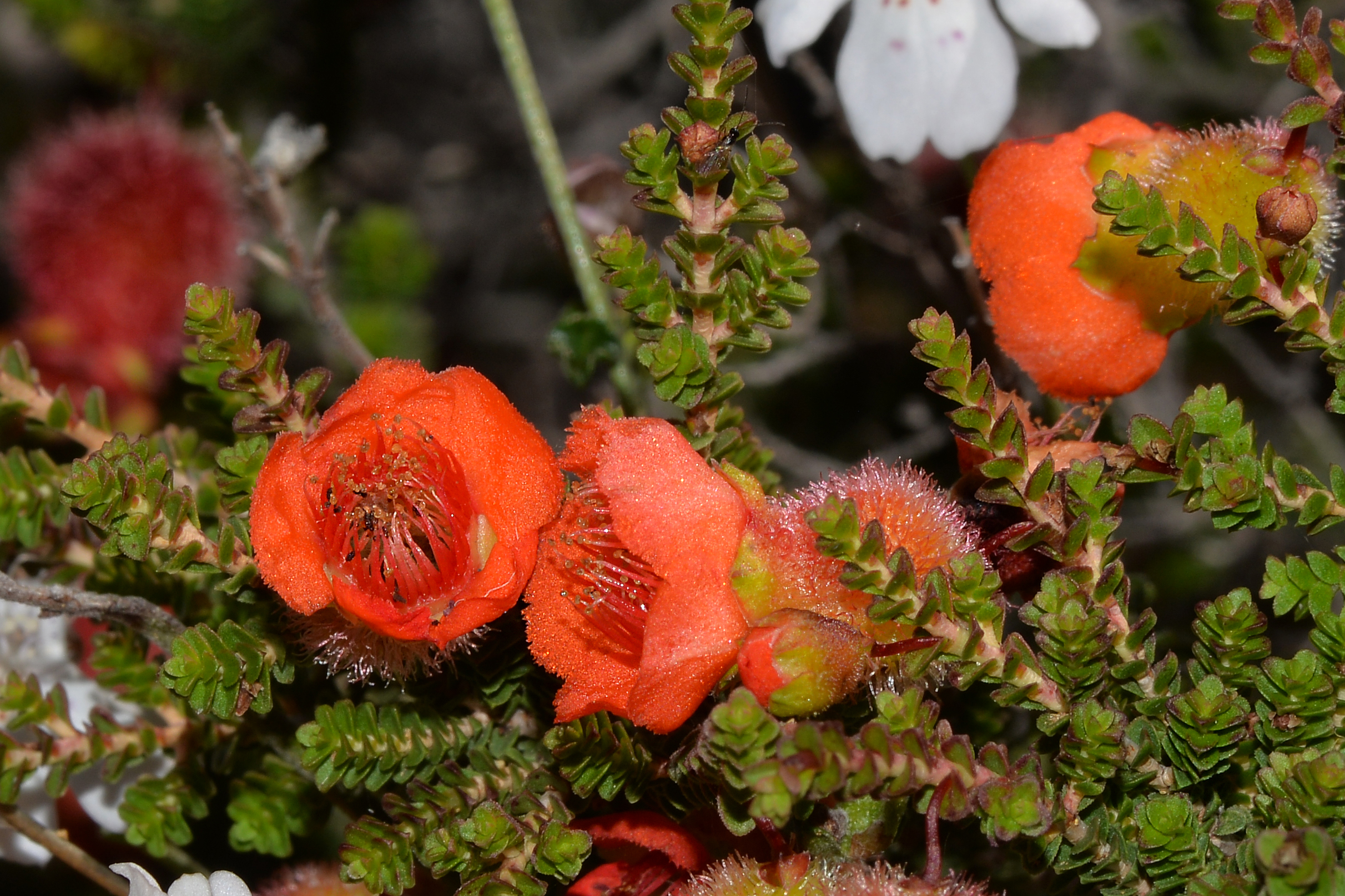
- Cheyniana microphylla

Scientific classification
- Kingdom: Plantae
- Clade: Tracheophytes
- Clade: Angiosperms
- Clade: Eudicots
- Clade: Rosids
- Order: Myrtales
- Family: Myrtaceae
- Subfamily: Myrtoideae
- Genus: Cheyniana; Rye

= Cheyniana =

Genus of flowering plants

Cheyniana is a genus of flowering plants in the family Myrtaceae. Two species are currently recognised, both endemic to Western Australia:

- Cheyniana microphylla (C.A.Gardner) Rye (basionym Balaustion microphyllum) - Bush pomegranate
- Cheyniana rhodella Rye & Trudgen (syn. Baeckea sp. Mullewa-Morawa)
