= Balaustion unguiculatum =

Conservation status
- Priority One — Poorly Known Taxa (DEC)

Scientific classification
- Kingdom: Plantae
- Clade: Tracheophytes
- Clade: Angiosperms
- Clade: Eudicots
- Clade: Rosids
- Order: Myrtales
- Family: Myrtaceae
- Genus: Balaustion
- Species: B. unguiculatum

Binomial name
- Balaustion unguiculatum Rye

Species of flowering plant

Balaustion unguiculatum is a species of flowering plant in the family Myrtaceae and is endemic to a restricted part of the south-west of Western Australia. It is shrub with egg-shaped leaves, the narrower end towards the base, white flowers tinged with pink, and 20 to 22 stamens.

== Description ==
Balaustion unguiculatum is a shrub that typically grows to 20 to 50 cm (7.9 to 19.7 in) high and 35–40 cm (14–16 in) wide, the flowering branchlets with up to four flowers. Its leaves are mostly egg-shaped with the narrower end towards the base, 2.0–3.5 mm (0.079–0.138 in) long and 1.2–1.6 mm (0.047–0.063 in) wide on a petiole 0.5–0.6 mm (0.020–0.024 in) long. The lower surface of the leaves is keeled near the tip, with usually two to four main rows of oil glands each side of the midvein. The flowers are about 13 mm (0.51 in) in diameter on a peduncle 2–3 mm (0.079–0.118 in) long. Each flower is on a pedicel 1–3 mm (0.039–0.118 in) long, the floral tube 2.0–2.5 mm (0.079–0.098 in) long, about 4 mm (0.16 in) wide and green, the free part 0.7 mm (0.028 in) long. The sepals are egg-shaped, 1.3–1.6 mm (0.051–0.063 in) long, 2–3 mm (0.079–0.118 in) wide and deep pink with an irregular white border. The petals are white, tinged with pink, 4.5–5.5 mm (0.18–0.22 in) long, with 20 to 22 stamens. Flowering has been recorded in September and October.

== Taxonomy ==
Balaustion unguiculatum was first formally described in 2022 by Barbara Lynette Rye in the journal Nuytsia from specimens collected by Kenneth Newbey north-north-west of Bullfinch in 1981. The specific epithet (unguiculatum) means 'clawed', referring to a projection on the underside of the leaves, that resembles a small claw.

== Distribution and habitat ==
This species of Balaustion is associated with granite outcrops in a small area north of Bullfinch in the Coolgardie bioregion of south-western Western Australia.

== Conservation status ==
Balaustion thamnoides is listed as "Priority One" by the Government of Western Australia Department of Biodiversity, Conservation and Attractions, meaning that it is known from only one or a few locations where it is potentially at risk.
