= Balaustion multicaule =

Conservation status
- Priority One — Poorly Known Taxa (DEC)

Scientific classification
- Kingdom: Plantae
- Clade: Tracheophytes
- Clade: Angiosperms
- Clade: Eudicots
- Clade: Rosids
- Order: Myrtales
- Family: Myrtaceae
- Genus: Balaustion
- Species: B. multicaule

Binomial name
- Balaustion multicaule Rye

Species of flowering plant

Balaustion multicaule is a species of flowering plant in the family Myrtaceae and is endemic to the south-west of Western Australia. It is a shrub with many stems at it base, narrowly to broadly egg-shaped or linear leaves and pale pink flowers with usually 18 to 20 stamens.

== Description ==
Balaustion multicaule is a shrub that typically grows to 15–30 cm (5.9–11.8 in) high and has many stems at its base. Its leaves are narrowly egg-shaped to very narrowly egg-shaped with the narrower end towards the base, or linear, about 3 mm (0.12 in) long and 0.5–0.7 mm (0.020–0.028 in) wide with one or two rows of oil glands each side of the midvein. The flowers are about 10–11 mm (0.39–0.43 in) in diameter, the flowers on a peduncle 3–5 mm (0.12–0.20 in) long. The floral tube is 1.7–2.3 mm (0.067–0.091 in) long and 3.0–4.5 mm (0.12–0.18 in) wide and green. The sepals are egg-shaped, about 1 mm (0.039 in) long, 1.6 mm (0.063 in) wide and red and the petals are pale pink, about 4 mm (0.16 in) long, with 18 to 20 stamens. Flowering occurs in October and November, and the fruit is a capsule 3.0–3.5 mm (0.12–0.14 in) long and 4–5 mm (0.16–0.20 in) in diameter.

== Taxonomy ==
Balaustion multicaule was first formally described in 2022 by Barbara Lynette Rye in the journal Nuytsia from specimens collected near the Mount Holland Track in 2004. The specific epithet (multicaule) means 'many stemmed'.

== Distribution and habitat ==
This species of Balaustion grows in sandy soils in heath and is only known from the Sheoak Rock area, east of Hyden in the Mallee bioregion of south-western Western Australia.

== Conservation status ==
Balaustion multicaule is listed as "Priority One" by the Government of Western Australia Department of Biodiversity, Conservation and Attractions, meaning that it is known from only one or a few locations where it is potentially at risk.
