= Balaustion hemisphaericum =

Conservation status
- Priority One — Poorly Known Taxa (DEC)

Scientific classification
- Kingdom: Plantae
- Clade: Tracheophytes
- Clade: Angiosperms
- Clade: Eudicots
- Clade: Rosids
- Order: Myrtales
- Family: Myrtaceae
- Genus: Balaustion
- Species: B. hemisphaericum

Binomial name
- Balaustion hemisphaericum Rye

Species of flowering plant

Balaustion hemisphaericum is a species of flowering plant in the family Myrtaceae and is endemic to a restricted area of Western Australia. It is a shrub with oblong to narrowly oblong or egg-shaped leaves, and white or pink flowers with 16 to 23 stamens.

== Description ==
Balaustion hemisphaericum is a shrub that typically grows to 20–60 cm (7.9–23.6 in) high and about 50 cm (20 in) wide. Its leaves are oblong to narrowly oblong or egg-shaped, 1.4–1.7 mm (0.055–0.067 in) long 0.7–1 mm (0.028–0.039 in) wide and 0.6–0.7 mm (0.024–0.028 in) thick with a deeply convex lower surface and two or three rows of oil glands either side of the midvein. The flowers are 7.5–9 mm (0.30–0.35 in) in diameter, each flower on a pedicel 0.4–2 mm (0.016–0.079 in) long. The floral tube is hemispherical, 1.3–1.5 mm (0.051–0.059 in) long and 2.5–3.5 mm (0.098–0.138 in) wide and the sepals are egg-shaped, 0.8–1.2 mm (0.031–0.047 in) long and 1.5–2.2 mm (0.059–0.087 in) wide with a deep pink border. The petals are white or pink, 2.5–4.0 mm (0.098–0.157 in) long, usually 3–4 mm (0.12–0.16 in) wide with 16 to 23 stamens. Flowering occurs from July to early October, and the fruit is a capsule 2.0–2.7 mm (0.079–0.106 in) long and 2.5–3.0 mm (0.098–0.118 in) in diameter.

== Taxonomy ==
Balaustion hemisphaericum was first formally described in 2022 by Barbara Lynette Rye in the journal Nuytsia from specimens collected north-east of Arrino in 1990. The specific epithet (hemisphaericum) means 'half-spherical', referring to the shape of the floral tube.

== Distribution and habitat ==
This species of Balaustion grows in rocky or gravelly habitats between Canna and Billeranga Hills near Merkanooka, in the Avon Wheatbelt bioregion.

== Conservation status ==
Balaustion hemisphaericum is listed as "Priority One" by the Government of Western Australia Department of Biodiversity, Conservation and Attractions, meaning that it is known from only one or a few locations where it is potentially at risk.
