= Balaustion spenceri =

Conservation status
- Priority One — Poorly Known Taxa (DEC)

Scientific classification
- Kingdom: Plantae
- Clade: Tracheophytes
- Clade: Angiosperms
- Clade: Eudicots
- Clade: Rosids
- Order: Myrtales
- Family: Myrtaceae
- Genus: Balaustion
- Species: B. spenceri

Binomial name
- Balaustion spenceri Rye

Species of flowering plant

Balaustion spenceri is a species of flowering plant in the family Myrtaceae and is endemic to the a restricted part of the south-west of Western Australia. It is shrub forming a low dome, with egg-shaped, narrowly egg-shaped or narrowly elliptic leaves, and white flowers with 20 to 24 stamens.

== Description ==
Balaustion spenceri is a shrub that forms a low dome 20–30 cm (7.9–11.8 in) wide and 50–90 cm (20–35 in) wide, the flowering branchlets with usually one flower or sometimes a pair of flowers. Its leaves are narrowly egg-shaped, sometimes with the narrower end towards the base, or narrowly elliptic, 3.0–3.5 mm (0.12–0.14 in) long and 0.6–1.1 mm (0.024–0.043 in) wide on a petiole 0.4–0.5 mm (0.016–0.020 in) long, the lower surface narrowly keeled near the tip with usually one or two main rows of oil glands each side of the midvein. The flowers are 8.5–11 mm (0.33–0.43 in) in diameter on a peduncle 1.0–2.5 mm (0.039–0.098 in) long, each flower on a pedicel 2.0–3.5 mm (0.079–0.138 in) long. The floral tube is 1.5–2.0 mm (0.059–0.079 in) long and 3–4 mm (0.12–0.16 in) wide, the free part about 0.7 mm (0.028 in) long and deep reddish. The sepals are broadly egg-shaped, 0.8–1.5 mm (0.031–0.059 in) long, 1.7–2.3 mm (0.067–0.091 in) wide and deep red with a whitish border. The petals are white, 3.5–5 mm (0.14–0.20 in) long, with 20 to 24 stamens. Flowering has been recorded in June and October.

== Taxonomy ==
Balaustion spenceri was first formally described in 2022 by Barbara Lynette Rye in the journal Nuytsia from specimens she collected with Malcolm Trudgen near Baladjie Rock in 2004. The specific epithet (spenceri) honours Phillip J. Spencer, who first collected this species in 1995.

== Distribution and habitat ==
This species of Balaustion grows in brown loam in high open shrubland between Warralakin and Bullfinch in the Avon Wheatbelt bioregion in the south-west of Western Australia.

== Conservation status ==
Balaustion spenceri is listed as "Priority One" by the Government of Western Australia Department of Biodiversity, Conservation and Attractions, meaning that it is known from only one or a few locations where it is potentially at risk.
