= Balaustion quinquelobum =

Scientific classification
- Kingdom: Plantae
- Clade: Tracheophytes
- Clade: Angiosperms
- Clade: Eudicots
- Clade: Rosids
- Order: Myrtales
- Family: Myrtaceae
- Genus: Balaustion
- Species: B. quinquelobum

Binomial name
- Balaustion quinquelobum Rye

Species of flowering plant

Balaustion quinquelobum is a species of flowering plant in the family Myrtaceae and is endemic to the south-west of Western Australia. It is low-growing to fairly erect shrub with narrowly egg-shaped or narrowly oblong to linear leaves, and white or pale pink flowers with 18 to 25 stamens.

== Description ==
Balaustion quinquelobum is a low-growing or fairly erect shrub that typically grows to 15–80 cm (5.9–31.5 in) high and 0.2–1.4 m (7.9 in – 4 ft 7.1 in) wide, the flowering branchlets with usually one pair of flowers. Its leaves are narrowly egg-shaped or narrowly oblong to linear, mostly 2–3 mm (0.079–0.118 in) long and 0.5–0.7 mm (0.020–0.028 in) wide, the lower surface keeled near the tip with usually one or two rows of oil glands each side of the midvein. The flowers are 10–14 mm (0.39–0.55 in) in diameter on a peduncle 1.5–2.5 mm (0.059–0.098 in) long, each flower on a pedicel 1.3–2.5 mm (0.051–0.098 in) long. The floral tube is 1.0–1.5 mm (0.039–0.059 in) long and 2.5–3.5 mm (0.098–0.138 in) wide and is distinctively five-lobed. The sepals are broadly egg-shaped, 1.5–2.0 mm (0.059–0.079 in) long, 2.3–2.8 mm (0.091–0.110 in) wide and reddish, sometimes with a whitish border. The petals are white or pale pink, 3.5–6 mm (0.14–0.24 in) long, with 18 to 25 stamens. Flowering has been recorded from August to November, mainly in September and October.

== Taxonomy ==
Balaustion quinquelobum was first formally described in 2022 by Barbara Lynette Rye in the journal Nuytsia from specimens collected 106 km (66 mi) west of Southern Cross in 1978. The specific epithet (quinquelobum) means 'five lobes' referring to the distinctive hypanthium.

== Distribution and habitat ==
This species of Balaustion grows in sandy soil in a range of vegetation associations between Welbungin, south to Lake Grace and to the east of Lake King in the Avon Wheatbelt, Coolgardie and Mallee bioregions in the south-west of Western Australia.

== Conservation status ==
Balaustion quinquelobum is listed as "not threatened" by the Government of Western Australia Department of Biodiversity, Conservation and Attractions.
