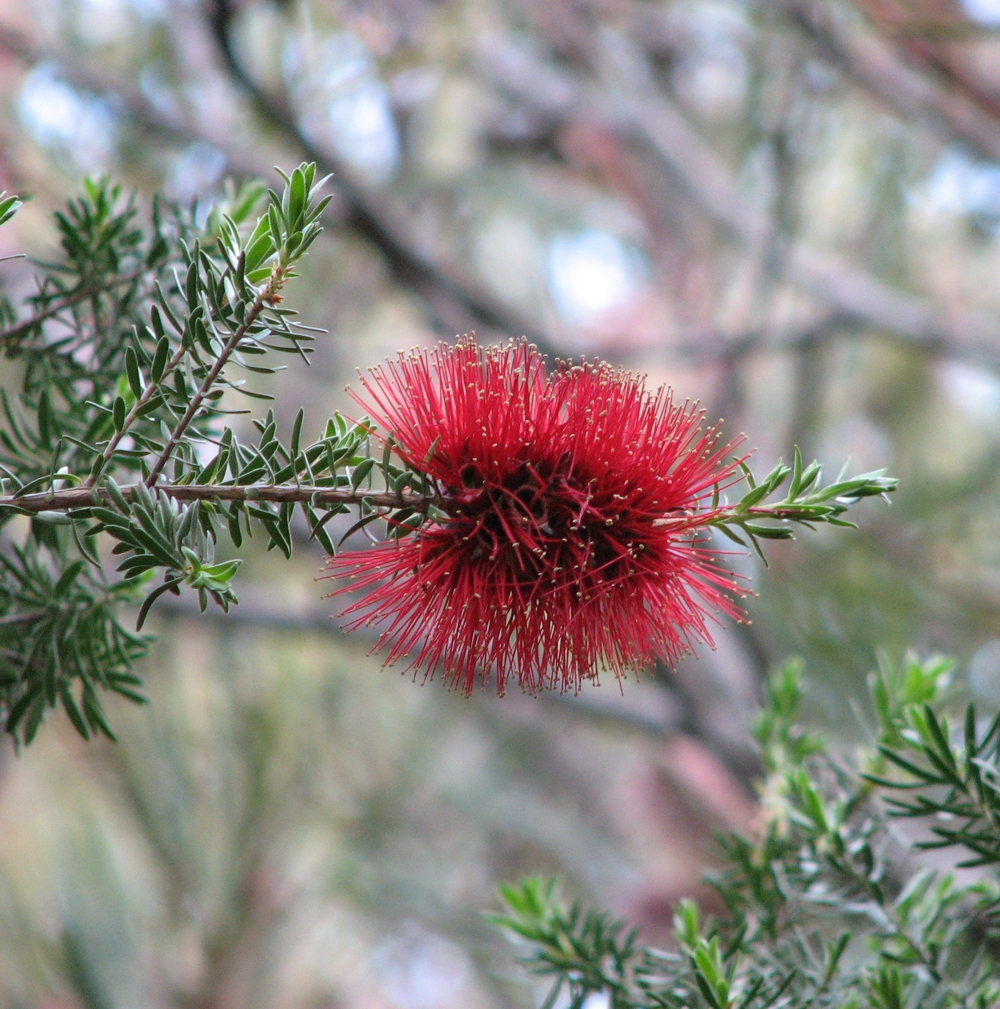
- Kunzea baxteri in Maranoa Gardens

Scientific classification
- Kingdom: Plantae
- Clade: Tracheophytes
- Clade: Angiosperms
- Clade: Eudicots
- Clade: Rosids
- Order: Myrtales
- Family: Myrtaceae
- Genus: Kunzea
- Species: K. baxteri

Binomial name
- Kunzea baxteri (Klotzsch) Schauer

Synonyms
- Pentagonaster baxteri Klotzsch

= Kunzea baxteri =

Scarlet kunzea

Species of flowering plant

Kunzea baxteri, commonly known as scarlet kunzea, is a flowering plant in the myrtle family Myrtaceae, and is endemic to the south-west of Western Australia where it occurs near granite outcrops and hills. It is a shrub with large, scarlet, bottlebrush-like flower clusters, making it popular as a garden feature.

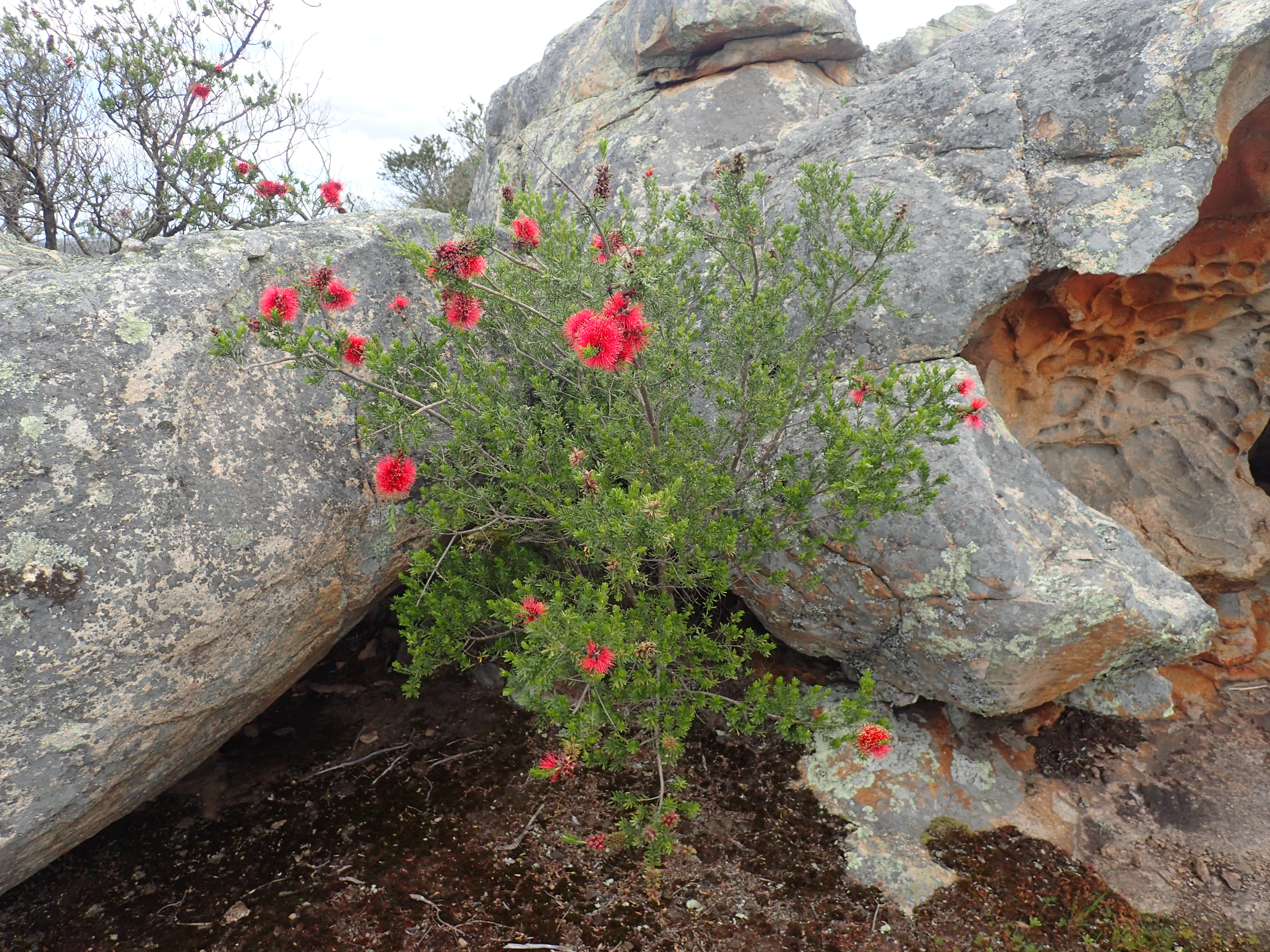
On Condingup Peak

== Description ==
Kunzea baxteri is a spreading shrub which usually grows to a height of between 1 and 3 m (3 and 10 ft) and has branches which are more or less hairy. The leaves are arranged alternately on a petiole 1–2 mm (0.04–0.08 in) long and have a leaf blade that is usually 14–18 mm (0.6–0.7 in) long, 2.5–3.5 mm (0.098–0.14 in) wide and oblong to elliptic in shape with hairs along the edges.

The flowers are arranged in large, profuse, conspicuous, bottlebrush-like clusters, up to 10 cm (4 in) long and 6 cm (2 in) wide. The clusters usually contain between 16 and 30 flowers on the ends of branches which continue to grow during the flowering period. There are leaf-like bracts 5–9 mm (0.2–0.4 in) long, 2–3 mm (0.08–0.1 in) wide at the base of the flowers which fall off as the flowers open. The hypanthium is 7–9 mm (0.3–0.4 in) long and hairy on the outside. There are five hairy, linear to lance-shaped sepals 4.5–6 mm (0.18–0.24 in) long which remain on the maturing fruit. The five petals are deep red, round to egg-shaped with the narrower end towards the base and 3.5–5 mm (0.1–0.2 in) long. There are between 40 and 50 bright red stamens 19–24 mm (0.7–0.9 in) long around each flower, the stamens four or five times as long as the petals. Flowering is most prolific from July to September but often occurs as late as March, depending on rainfall. The fruit is a cup-shaped or urn-shaped capsule 8–10 mm (0.3–0.4 in) long with the erect sepals attached. The fruit release the seeds when mature, unlike many others in the Myrtaceae. The features of this species that distinguish it from others in the Myrtaceae are the red flowers, persistent sepals and deciduous fruit. The oblong leaves and narrow sepals distinguish it from Kunzea pulchella which also has red flowers.

== Taxonomy and naming ==
The species was first formally described in 1836 by Johann Klotzsch, who gave it the name Pentagonaster baxteri and published the description in Allgemeine Gartenzeitung. In 1844, Johannes Conrad Schauer revised the name to Kunzea baxteri. The specific epithet (baxteri) honours William Baxter, an English gardener who collected seeds and plants for British nurserymen.

== Distribution and habitat ==
Kunzea baxteri grows in coarse sandy soil or laterite, often near granite outcrops in heath, scrub or woodland. It is found from the coast to areas up to about 100 km (60 mi) inland in the Esperance Plains, Jarrah Forest, Mallee and Swan Coastal Plain biogeographic regions.

== Ecology ==
Scarlet kunzea is pollinated by honeyeaters and mammals which are attracted to its large red flowers.

== Conservation ==
Kunzea baxteri is classified as "not threatened" by the Western Australian Government Department of Parks and Wildlife.

== Use in horticulture ==
This kunzea has been grown in gardens for many years. It is best suited to a climate with dry summers and wet winters. It is, however, adaptable to more humid areas and those with moderate frosts but requires a sunny or partly-shaded area with well-drained soil. It has been grown from cuttings on Kunzea ambigua rootstock.
