= Kirkalocka Gold Mine =

Gold mine in Western Australia

Kirkalocka
- Location in Western Australia
- Interactive map of Kirkalocka
- Location: Mount Magnet, Western Australia, Australia; 28°40′32″S 117°45′43″E
- Production: 0
- Financial year: 2020–21
- Opened: 2002
- Active: 2002–2008 2019–2021
- Company: Adaman Resources
- Acquired: 2018

The Kirkalocka Gold Mine is an active gold mine located 70 km south of Mount Magnet, Western Australia. The mine had been placed in care and maintenance in 2008 but reopened for a brief period between 2018 and 2021. The mine's owner, Adaman Resources, was placed into administration in May 2021.

It was named after the nearby Kirkalocka sheep station.

== History ==
Gold mines in the Mid West region

Exploration at Kirkalocka has been carried out by a number of companies, including Sons of Gwalia, before Equigold Limited acquired the area in 2001.

Equigold, after constructing a plant, commenced mining in September 2002. Over the next six years, the company extracted 307,621 ounces of gold from the deposit, at a grade of 1.52 g/t. Equigold finished mining in October 2005, and continued milling broken ore stockpiles until 14 August 2008. The mine was placed in care and maintenance in September 2008.

Equigold Limited sold the Kirkalocka tenements to Mount Magnet South NL in April 2008. The Kirkalocka plant, with associated infrastructure, was acquired by Mount Magnet South in a separate transaction in March 2009.

In November 2015, Kirkalocka was sold to Minjar Gold Pty Ltd, a subsidiary of Shandong Tyan Home Co Ltd, a company listed on the Shanghai Stock Exchange.

The mine was purchased from Minjar Gold by a private company, Adaman Resources in 2017 for A$12 million. Adaman recommenced mining in late 2018. Adaman entered voluntary administration in May 2021, with the company believed to owe creditors more than A$100 million. Administrators Cor Cordis announced a refinancing of the company in August 2021.

== Production ==
Production of the mine:

Year	Production	Grade	Cost per ounce
2002–03	45,375 oz	1.64 g/t	A$359
2003–04	67,454 oz	1.74 g/t	A$341
2004–05	59,367 oz	1.94 g/t	A$399
2005–06	47,638 oz	1.39 g/t	A$384
2006–07	37,472 oz	1.07 g/t	A$432
2007–08	42,589 oz	1.06 g/t	A$423
2008–09	7,726 oz	1.26 g/t	A$292
2005–2018	inactive		
2018–19			
2019–20			
2020–21			
2021–present	inactive		
