= Balaustion exsertum =

Conservation status
- Priority Three — Poorly Known Taxa (DEC)

Scientific classification
- Kingdom: Plantae
- Clade: Tracheophytes
- Clade: Angiosperms
- Clade: Eudicots
- Clade: Rosids
- Order: Myrtales
- Family: Myrtaceae
- Genus: Balaustion
- Species: B. exsertum

Binomial name
- Balaustion exsertum (S.Moore) Rye

Synonyms
- Baeckea exserta S.Moore

Species of flowering plant

Balaustion exsertum is a species of flowering plant in the family Myrtaceae and is endemic to the south-west of Western Australia. It is a low-growing, often ground-hugging shrub with narrowly oblong leaves, white flowers, and 17 to 24 stamens.

== Description ==
Balaustion exsertum is a low-growing, often ground-hugging shrub that typically grows to 10–30 cm (3.9–11.8 in) high and 30–150 cm (12–59 in) wide, the flowering branchlets with one or two flowers in leaf axils. Its leaves are widely spreading in dense clusters, mostly narrowly oblong, 15–45 mm (0.59–1.77 in) long and 0.5–1 mm (0.020–0.039 in) wide on a petiole 0.3–0.6 mm (0.012–0.024 in) long. The lower surface of the leaves is keeled near the tip, with usually one or two main rows of oil glands each side of the midvein. The flowers are 8–12 mm (0.31–0.47 in) in diameter on a peduncle 1.3–4.5 mm (0.051–0.177 in) long. Each flower is on a pedicel 1.2–3.5 mm (0.047–0.138 in) long, the floral tube is cone-shaped or hemispherical, 1.3–2.0 mm (0.051–0.079 in) long, 3.0–3.5 mm (0.12–0.14 in) wide, green and brownish-purple, the free part 0.4–0.5 mm (0.016–0.020 in) long. The sepals are egg-shaped, 1.0–1.8 mm (0.039–0.071 in) long, 2–3 mm (0.079–0.118 in) wide and reddish with a broad, pale border. The petals are white, 3–6 mm (0.12–0.24 in) long, with 17 to 24 stamens. Flowering occurs from in August to October.

== Taxonomy ==
The species was first formally described in 1920 by Spencer Le Marchant Moore who gave it the name Baeckea exserta in the Journal of the Linnean Society, Botany from specimens collected by Frederick Stoward near Bruce Rock. In 2022, Barbara Lynette Rye transferred the species to Balaustion as B. exsertum, in the journal Nuytsia. The specific epithet (exsertum) means "protruding", referring to the exposed stamens.

== Distribution and habitat ==
Balaustion exsertum grows in yellow sand with eucalypts, Allocasuarinas and Melaleucas, between the Kodi Kodjin Nature Reserve (near Trayning) and south-east to Quairading and south-west to near Narembeen, in the Avon Wheatbelt and Mallee bioregions in the south-west of Western Australia.

== Conservation status ==
Balaustion exsertum is listed as "Priority Three" by the Government of Western Australia Department of Biodiversity, Conservation and Attractions, meaning that it is poorly known and known from only a few locations but is not under imminent threat.
