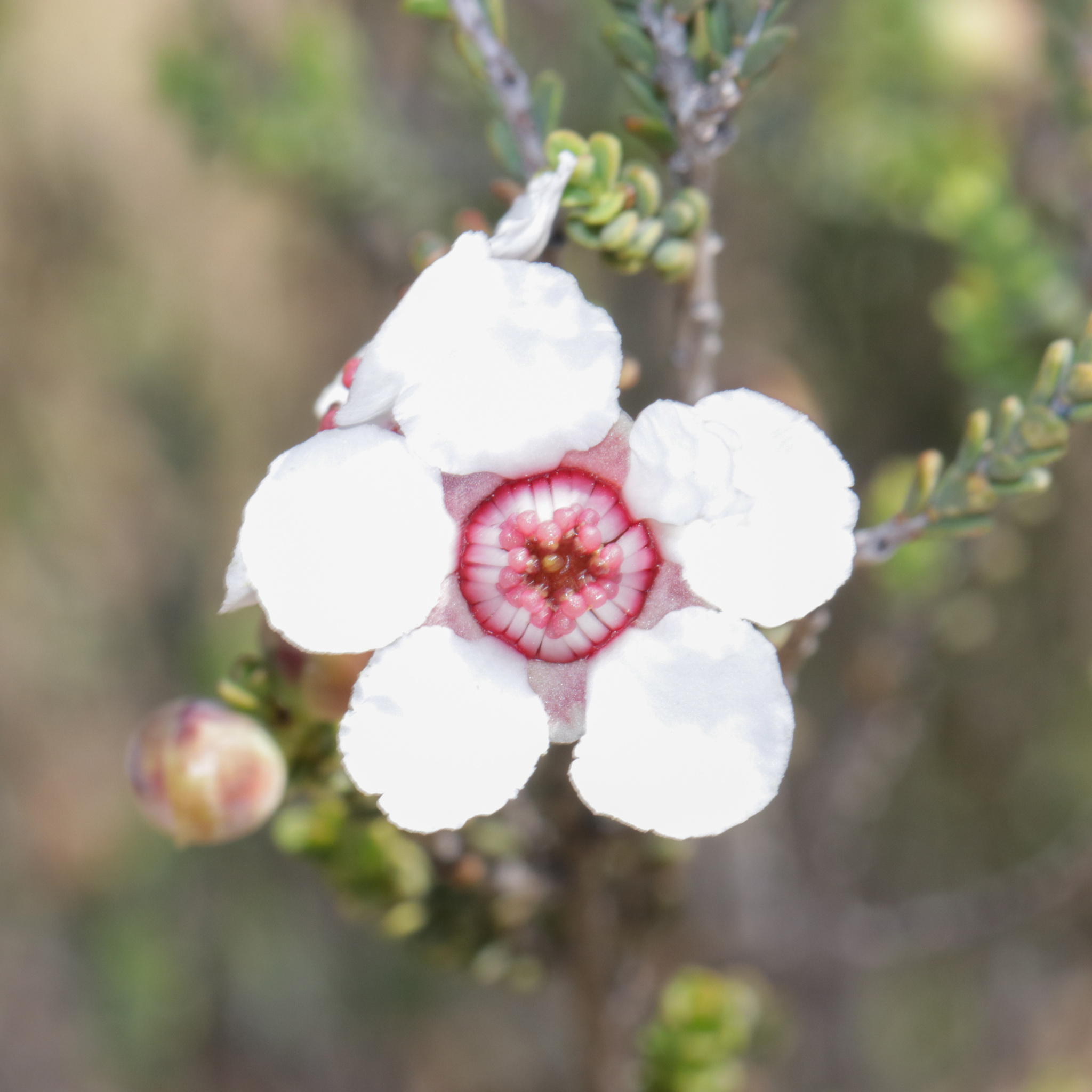
- Near Bonnie Rock

Conservation status
- Priority Three — Poorly Known Taxa (DEC)

Scientific classification
- Kingdom: Plantae
- Clade: Embryophytes
- Clade: Tracheophytes
- Clade: Spermatophytes
- Clade: Angiosperms
- Clade: Eudicots
- Clade: Rosids
- Order: Myrtales
- Family: Myrtaceae
- Genus: Balaustion
- Species: B. mukinbudin

Binomial name
- Balaustion mukinbudin Rye

= Balaustion mukinbudin =

Species of flowering plant

Balaustion mukinbudin is a species of flowering plant in the family Myrtaceae and is endemic to inland Western Australia. It is a shrub with narrowly to broadly egg-shaped leaves, the narrower end towards the base, and white flowers with usually 19 to 25 stamens.

== Description ==
Balaustion mukinbudin is a shrub that typically grows to 20–80 cm (7.9–31.5 in) high and about 30–100 cm (12–39 in) wide. Its leaves are narrowly to broadly egg-shaped with the narrower end towards the base, 2–4 mm (0.079–0.157 in) long and about 1.2–1.6 mm (0.047–0.063 in) wide with two or three rows of oil glands each side of the midvein. The flowers are about 11–16 mm (0.43–0.63 in) in diameter, the flowers on a peduncle 2.5–4.0 mm (0.098–0.157 in) long. The floral tube is 2.0–2.7 mm (0.079–0.106 in) long and about 5 mm (0.20 in) wide, green and often tinged with red. The sepals are egg-shaped to elliptic, 1.4–2.5 mm (0.055–0.098 in) long, 2.5–3.5 mm (0.098–0.138 in) wide and reddish with a whitish irregular border. The petals are white, 4.0–6.5 mm (0.16–0.26 in) long, with 19 to 25 stamens. Flowering occurs from September and November, and the fruit is a capsule about 4 mm (0.16 in) long and 5 mm (0.20 in) in diameter.

== Taxonomy ==
Balaustion mukinbudin was first formally described in 2022 by Barbara Lynette Rye in the journal Nuytsia from specimens collected north-east of Mukinbudin in 2005. The specific epithet (mukinbudin) refers to the town of Mukinbudin, which is the centre of occurrence for the genus.

== Distribution and habitat ==
This species of Balaustion grows in sandy soils, sometimes with Melaleuca species or Baeckea elderiana, from east of Bonnie Rock to Chiddarcooping Nature Reserve in the Avon Wheatbelt and Coolgardie bioregions of Western Australia.

== Conservation status ==
Balaustion mukinbudin is listed as "Priority Three" by the Government of Western Australia Department of Biodiversity, Conservation and Attractions, meaning that it is poorly known and known from only a few locations but is not under imminent threat.

== Gallery ==
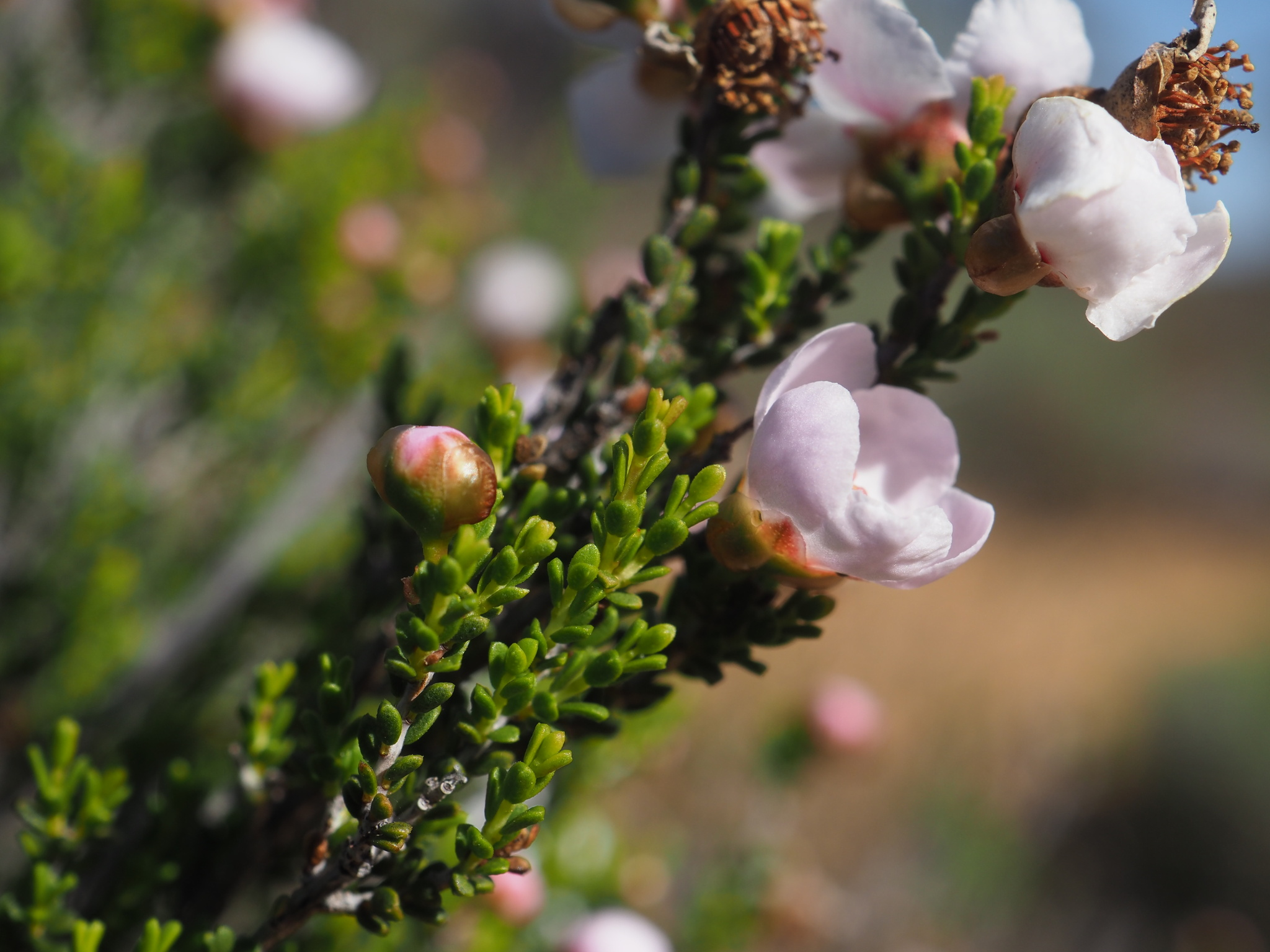

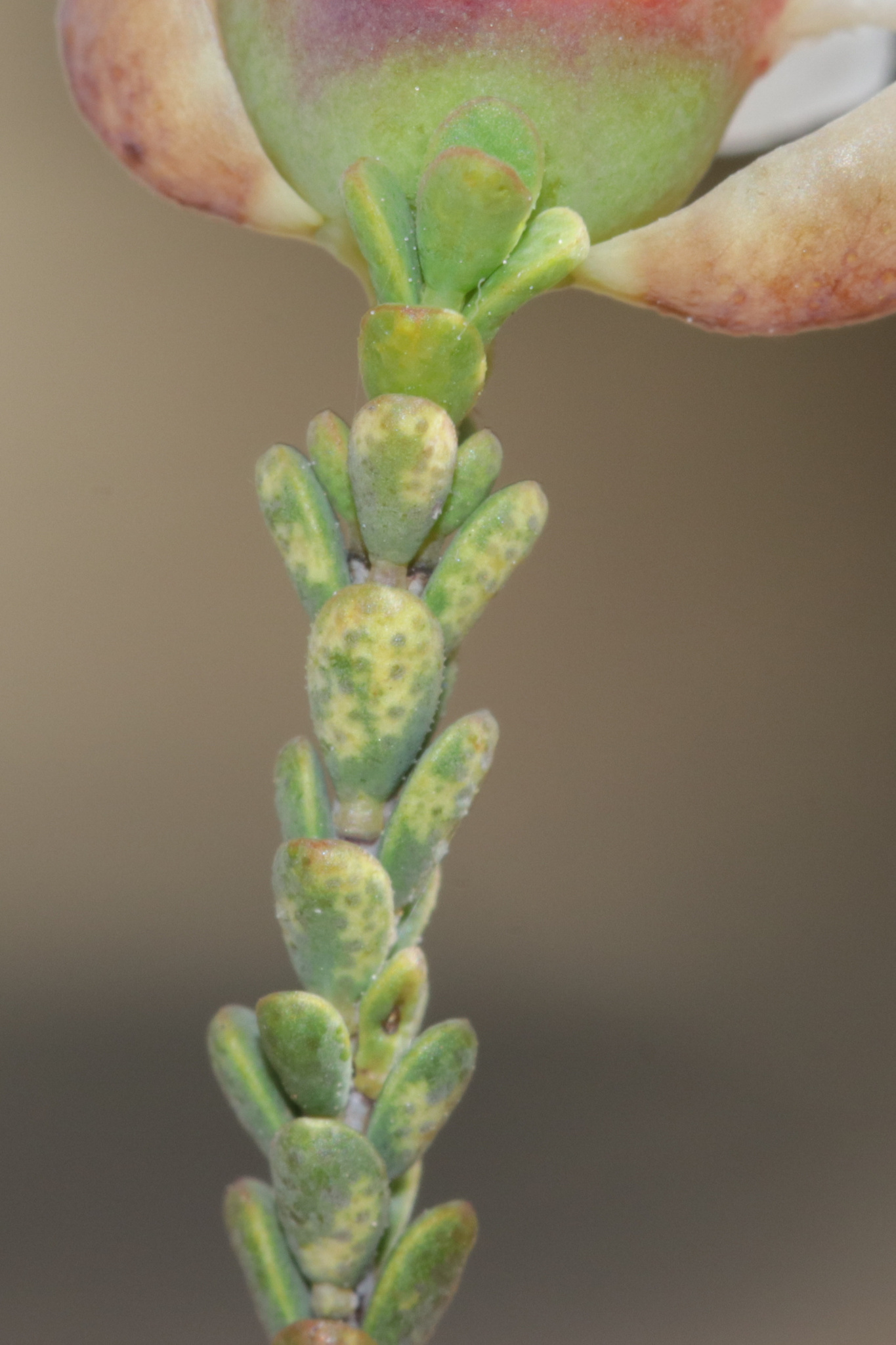

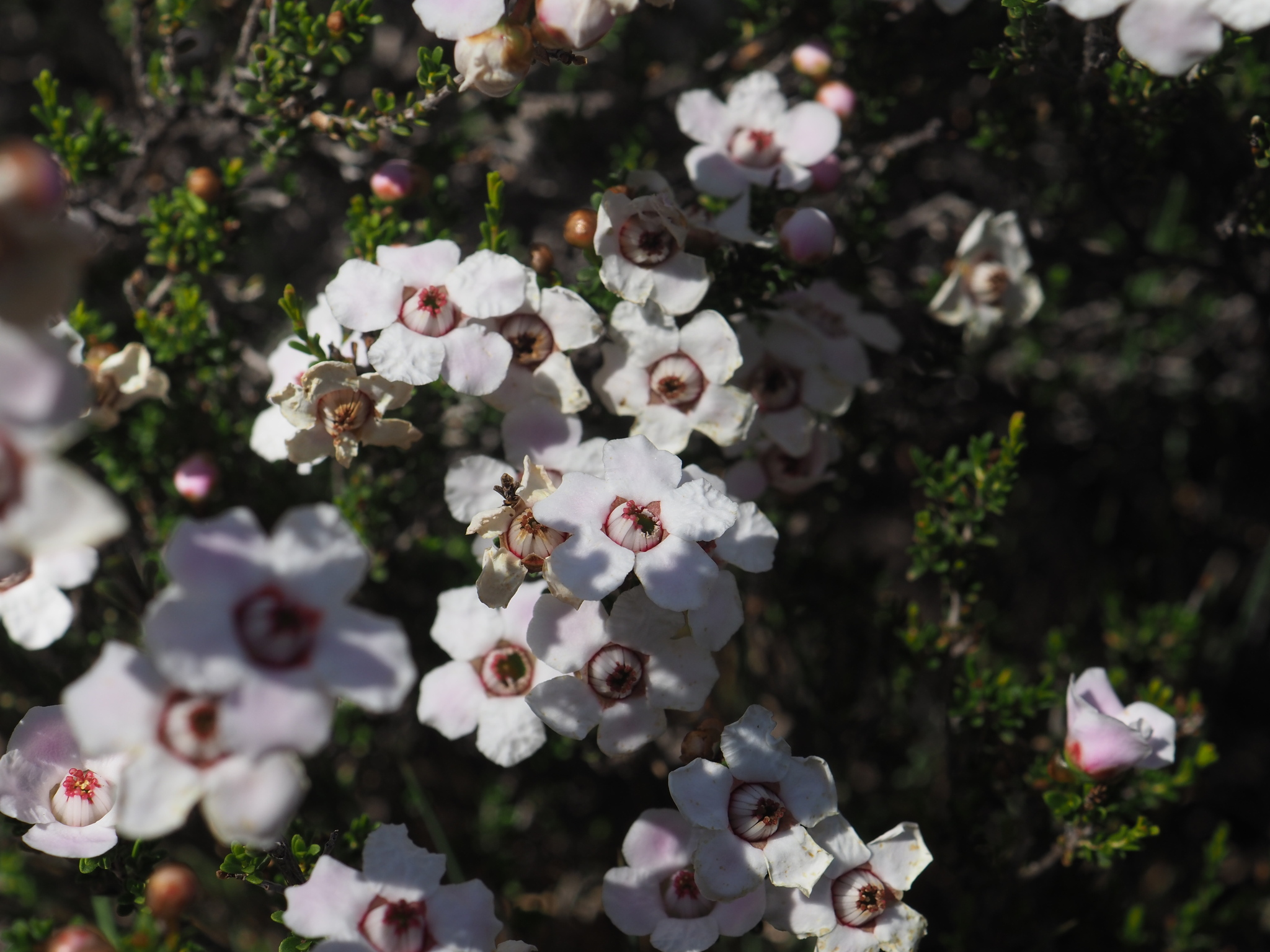

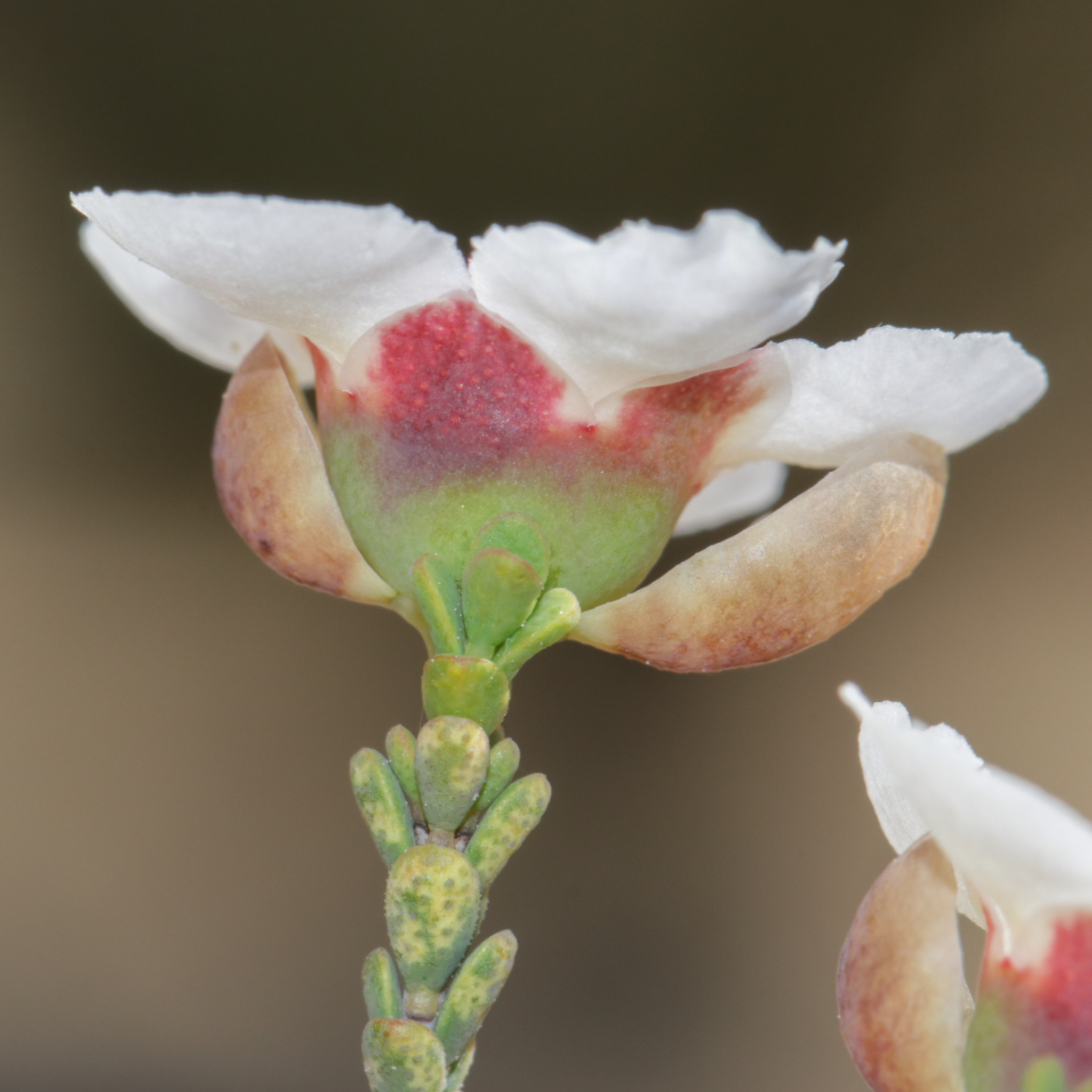
