= Balaustion polyandrum =

Conservation status
- Priority One — Poorly Known Taxa (DEC)

Scientific classification
- Kingdom: Plantae
- Clade: Tracheophytes
- Clade: Angiosperms
- Clade: Eudicots
- Clade: Rosids
- Order: Myrtales
- Family: Myrtaceae
- Genus: Balaustion
- Species: B. polyandrum

Binomial name
- Balaustion polyandrum Rye

Species of flowering plant

Balaustion polyandrum is a species of flowering plant in the family Myrtaceae and is endemic to the south-west of Western Australia. It is usually a shrub with egg-shaped leaves, the narrower end towards the base, and white flowers with about 30 stamens.

== Description ==
Balaustion polyandrum is a shrub that typically grows to 50 cm (20 in) high, the flowering branchlets with one pair of flowers. Its leaves are egg-shaped with the narrower end towards the base, 3–4 mm (0.12–0.16 in) long and 1.2–1.5 mm (0.047–0.059 in) wide, the lower surface narrowly keeled with one or two rows of oil glands each side of the midvein. The flowers are 15–17 mm (0.59–0.67 in) in diameter on a peduncle 3–4 mm (0.12–0.16 in) long, each flower on a pedicel 0.5–1 mm (0.020–0.039 in) long. The floral tube is 3–4 mm (0.12–0.16 in) long and 5–6 mm (0.20–0.24 in) wide, the sepals egg-shaped, 0.8–1 mm (0.031–0.039 in) long, about 3 mm (0.12 in) wide and deep reddish with a whitish border, and the petals are white, 6–7 mm (0.24–0.28 in) long, with about 30 stamens. Flowering has been recorded in October.

== Taxonomy ==
Balaustion polyandrum was first formally described in 2022 by Barbara Lynette Rye in the journal Nuytsia from specimens collected on Jaurdi Station in 1999. The specific epithet (polyandrum) means 'many males' referring to the many stamens.

== Distribution and habitat ==
This species of Balaustion grows in yellowish sand in low woodland and Acacia heath and is only known from the type location east of Koolyanobbing in the Coolgardie bioregion of Western Australia.

== Conservation status ==
Balaustion polyandrum is listed as "Priority One" by the Government of Western Australia Department of Biodiversity, Conservation and Attractions, meaning that it is known from only one or a few locations where it is potentially at risk.
