= Grevillea kirkalocka =

Conservation status
- Data Deficient (IUCN 3.1)

- Priority One — Poorly Known Taxa (DEC)

Scientific classification
- Kingdom: Plantae
- Clade: Embryophytes
- Clade: Tracheophytes
- Clade: Angiosperms
- Clade: Eudicots
- Order: Proteales
- Family: Proteaceae
- Genus: Grevillea
- Species: G. kirkalocka

Binomial name
- Grevillea kirkalocka Olde & Marriott

Species of shrub endemic to Western Australia

Grevillea kirkalocka is a species of flowering plant in the family Proteaceae and is endemic to inland Western Australia. It is a low, spreading shrub with divided leaves with sharply-pointed linear lobes and clusters of red flowers.

== Description ==
Grevillea kirkalocka is a low, spreading shrub that typically grows to 40–60 cm (16–24 in) high and 1.0–1.5 mm (0.039–0.059 in) wide and has arching branches. Its leaves are divided, 40–60 mm (1.6–2.4 in) wide and about 60 mm (2.4 in) wide in outline, with three to five leaflets usually divided again, the end lobes linear, 12–22 mm (0.47–0.87 in) long, 1.2 mm (0.047 in) long and sharply pointed. The flowers are arranged in upper leaf axils or on the ends of branches in branched clusters, each 60–80 mm (2.4–3.1 in) long. The clusters are on a peduncle 60–80 mm (2.4–3.1 in) long, each flower on a pedicel 4.0–4.2 mm (0.16–0.17 in) long, the flowers red, the pistil about 25 mm (0.98 in) long. Flowering occurs from August to September and the fruit is an egg-shaped follicle 11–12 mm (0.43–0.47 in) long.

== Taxonomy ==
Grevillea kirkalocka was first formally described in 2002 by Peter M. Olde and Neil R. Marriott in the journal Nuytsia from specimens collected on Kirkalocka Station in 1995. The specific epithet (kirkalocka) refers to the type location, and as a "mark of respect for the proprietors who have a progressive conservation ethic".

== Distribution and habitat ==
This grevillea grows on sandheath and is only known from within 20 km (12 mi) of the type location in the Murchison bioregion of inland Western Australia.

== Conservation status ==
Grevillea kirkalocka is listed as 'Priority One' by the Government of Western Australia Department of Biodiversity, Conservation and Attractions, meaning that it is known from only one or a few locations which are potentially at risk.
