= Balaustion thamnoides =

Conservation status
- Priority Two — Poorly Known Taxa (DEC)

Scientific classification
- Kingdom: Plantae
- Clade: Tracheophytes
- Clade: Angiosperms
- Clade: Eudicots
- Clade: Rosids
- Order: Myrtales
- Family: Myrtaceae
- Genus: Balaustion
- Species: B. thamnoides

Binomial name
- Balaustion thamnoides Rye

Species of flowering plant

Balaustion thamnoides is a species of flowering plant in the family Myrtaceae and is endemic to a restricted part of the south-west of Western Australia. It is shrub with mostly narrowly elliptic leaves and white or pale pink flowers with 19 to 28 stamens.

== Description ==
Balaustion thamnoides is a shrub that typically grows to 0.7–1.2 m (2 ft 4 in – 3 ft 11 in) high and 0.4–0.6 m (1 ft 4 in – 2 ft 0 in) wide, the flowering branchlets with up to four flowers. Its leaves are mostly narrowly elliptic, 3.0–5.5 mm (0.12–0.22 in) long and 1.1–1.4 mm (0.043–0.055 in) wide on a petiole 0.6–0.8 mm (0.024–0.031 in) long. The lower surface of the leaves is keeled with usually two or three main rows of oil glands each side of the midvein. The flowers are 13–17 mm (0.51–0.67 in) in diameter on a peduncle 3–5 mm (0.12–0.20 in) long. Each flower is on a pedicel 0.3–1 mm (0.012–0.039 in) long, the floral tube 2.5–4.0 mm (0.098–0.157 in) long and 5–6 mm (0.20–0.24 in) wide, the free part 0.8 mm (0.031 in) long and often reddish-tinged. The sepals are egg-shaped, 1.2–2.0 mm (0.047–0.079 in) long, 3.0–3.5 mm (0.12–0.14 in) wide and reddish, sometimes with an irregular white border. The petals are white or pale pink, 4.5–6.5 mm (0.18–0.26 in) long, with 19 to 28 stamens. Flowering has been recorded from late June to November.

== Taxonomy ==
Balaustion thamnoides was first formally described in 2022 by Barbara Lynette Rye in the journal Nuytsia from specimens collected by Kenneth Newbey near Lake King in 1979. The specific epithet (thamnoides) means 'like a bush', referring to the fairly erect, shrubby habit of this species, compared to others in the genus.

== Distribution and habitat ==
This species of Balaustion often grows in gravelly or rocky soils with Melaleuca, Allocasuarina or Eucalyptus species between Hatter Hill and the western end of Frank Hann National Park, in the Mallee bioregion of south-western Western Australia.

== Conservation status ==
Balaustion thamnoides is listed as "Priority Two" by the Western Australian Government Department of Biodiversity, Conservation and Attractions, meaning that it is poorly known and from only one or a few locations.
