= Balaustion bimucronatum =

Conservation status
- Priority One — Poorly Known Taxa (DEC)

Scientific classification
- Kingdom: Plantae
- Clade: Tracheophytes
- Clade: Angiosperms
- Clade: Eudicots
- Clade: Rosids
- Order: Myrtales
- Family: Myrtaceae
- Genus: Balaustion
- Species: B. bimucronatum

Binomial name
- Balaustion bimucronatum Rye

Species of flowering plant

Balaustion bimucronatum is a species of flowering plant in the family Myrtaceae and is endemic to the south-west of Western Australia. It is a shrub with narrowly egg-shaped to linear leaves with a small point on the end and often with a second point on the keel, and usually white flowers, sometimes with a pink tinge, and 16 to 21 stamens.

== Description ==
Balaustion bimucronatum is a shrub that typically grows to 20 cm (7.9 in) high, about 30 cm (12 in) wide. Its leaves are mostly narrowly egg-shaped to linear, 2.5–3.5 mm (0.098–0.138 in) long 0.8–1.2 mm (0.031–0.047 in) wide and 0.4–0.5 mm (0.016–0.020 in) thick on a petiole 0.4–0.6 mm (0.016–0.024 in) long. The leaves have a small, hard tip on the ends, keel-shaped near the tip, sometimes with a second small tip near the tip, and one or two rows of oil glands either side of the midvein. The flowers are arranged in pairs, or often singly, usually 10–11 mm (0.39–0.43 in) in diameter, each flower on a pedicel 0.6–2 mm (0.024–0.079 in) long. The floral tube is about 2 mm (0.079 in) long and 3.5–4.0 mm (0.14–0.16 in) wide and the sepals are very broadly egg-shaped, 1.2–1.5 mm (0.047–0.059 in) long and 1.8–2.5 mm (0.071–0.098 in) wide with a pink tinge. The petals are white, sometimes tinged with pink, 3.5–4.0 mm (0.14–0.16 in) long with 16 to 21 stamens. Flowering has been recorded in October, and the fruit is a capsule about 3.5 mm (0.14 in) long and 3.5–4.0 mm (0.14–0.16 in) in diameter.

== Taxonomy ==
Balaustion bimucronatum was first formally described in 2022 by Barbara Lynette Rye in the journal Nuytsia from specimens collected in south of Mukinbudin in 2003. The specific epithet (bimucronatum) means 'two mucronate', referring to the two points on the leaves.

== Distribution and habitat ==
This species of Balaustion has been recorded southeast of Mukinbudin in the Avon Wheatbelt bioregion, where it grows in yellow sand with mallee eucalypts, Acacia species and Thryptomene kochii.

== Conservation status ==
Balaustion bimucronatum is listed as "Priority One" by the Government of Western Australia Department of Biodiversity, Conservation and Attractions, meaning that it is known from only one or a few locations where it is potentially at risk.
