= Balaustion grandibracteatum =

Scientific classification
- Kingdom: Plantae
- Clade: Tracheophytes
- Clade: Angiosperms
- Clade: Eudicots
- Clade: Rosids
- Order: Myrtales
- Family: Myrtaceae
- Genus: Balaustion
- Species: B. grandibracteatum

Binomial name
- Balaustion grandibracteatum (E.Pritz.) Rye

Synonyms
- Baeckea grandibracteata E.Pritz.

Species of flowering plant

Balaustion grandibracteatum is a species of flowering plant in the family Myrtaceae and is endemic to inland Western Australia. It is a shrub with mostly narrowly oblong to elliptic leaves and white flowers with 14 to 27 stamens.

== Description ==
Balaustion grandibracteatum is a shrub that typically grows to 20–80 cm (7.9–31.5 in) high and 30–80 cm (12–31 in) wide. Its leaves are mostly narrowly oblong to elliptic, 2–5 mm (0.079–0.197 in) long and 0.7–1.0 mm (0.028–0.039 in) wide on a petiole 0.1–0.6 mm (0.0039–0.0236 in) long. Its flowers are borne singly or in pairs on a peduncle 1–6 m (3 ft 3 in – 19 ft 8 in) long, each flower 10–15 mm (0.39–0.59 in) in diameter and sessile. The floral tube is 1.7–3 mm (0.067–0.118 in) long and 3.5–5 mm (0.14–0.20 in) wide and the sepals are egg-shaped, 0.6–2 mm (0.024–0.079 in) long and 2.5–3.0 mm (0.098–0.118 in) wide. The petals are white, 4.0–6.5 mm (0.16–0.26 in) long with 14 to 27 stamens. Flowering time depends on subspecies, and the fruit is a capsule 3.0–3.5 mm (0.12–0.14 in) long and 4.5–5.0 mm (0.18–0.20 in) wide.

== Taxonomy ==
This species was first formally described in 1904 by Ernst Georg Pritzel who gave it the name Baeckea grandibracteata Engler's journal Botanische Jahrbücher für Systematik, Pflanzengeschichte und Pflanzengeographie in an article by Pritzel and Ludwig Diels entitled Fragmenta Phytographiae Australiae occidentalis. In 2022, Barbara Lynette Rye transferred the species to Balaustion as B. grandibracteatum in the journal Nuytsia. The specific epithet (grandibracteatum) is from the Latin grandis meaning 'great, large or tall' and bracteatus meaning bracteate, referring to the large bracteoles enclosed the mature flower buds.

In the same edition of Nuytsia, Rye described three subspecies of B. grandibracteatum, and the names are accepted by Plants of the World Online:

- Balaustion grandibracteatum subsp. grandibracteatum has bracteoles enclosing late buds and persisting after the flowers open. Flowering occurs from September to December.
- Balaustion grandibracteatum subsp. juncturum Rye has bracteoles enclosing late buds but rarely persisting after the flowers open. Flowering has been observed in October and November.
- Balaustion grandibracteatum subsp. meridionale Rye has pedicels 0.7–1.5 mm (0.028–0.059 in) long and longer than those of the other subspecies, and bracteoles 2–3 mm (0.079–0.118 in) long and shorter than those of the other subspecies and that fall off before the flowers open. Flowering has been recorded in October and November.

== Distribution and habitat ==
Balaustion grandibracteatum has been recorded between the Southern Cross area to near Hyden and Frank Hann National Park in the Avon Wheatbelt, Coolgardie and Mallee bioregions of inland Western Australia. Subspecies grandibracteatum has been recorded from west of Southern Cross to Yellowdine and the Parker Range area where it often grows in yellow sand in the Avon Wheatbelt and Coolgardie bioregions. Subspecies junctura is found from the Mount Holland to the Forrestania area in the Coolgardie and Mallee bioregions and subsp. meridionalis occurs from the Mount Gibbs to beyond the eastern end of Frank Hann National, where both subspecies grow in sandy soils, sometimes with lateritic gravel or granite cobbles in shrubland.

== Conservation status ==
Balaustion grandibracteatum is listed as "not threatened" by the Government of Western Australia Department of Biodiversity, Conservation and Attractions, but subsp. grandibracteatum is listed as "Priority Three" by the Government of Western Australia Department of Biodiversity, Conservation and Attractions, meaning that it is poorly known and known from only a few locations but is not under imminent threat, but subsp. junctura and subsp. meridionale as "Priority Two", meaning that they are poorly known and from one or a few locations.
