= Balaustion baiocalyx =

Conservation status
- Priority One — Poorly Known Taxa (DEC)

Scientific classification
- Kingdom: Plantae
- Clade: Tracheophytes
- Clade: Angiosperms
- Clade: Eudicots
- Clade: Rosids
- Order: Myrtales
- Family: Myrtaceae
- Genus: Balaustion
- Species: B. baiocalyx

Binomial name
- Balaustion baiocalyx Rye

Species of flowering plant

Balaustion baiocalyx is a species of flowering plant in the family Myrtaceae and is endemic to the south-west of Western Australia. It is a shrub with egg-shaped leaves with the narrower end towards the base, and usually white flowers with 22 to 24 stamens.

== Description ==
Balaustion baiocalyx is a shrub that typically grows to 30–90 cm (12–35 in) high, 15–60 cm (5.9–23.6 in) wide and is single-stemmed at it base. Its leaves are egg-shaped with the narrower end towards the base, usually 2–5 mm (0.079–0.197 in) long and 1–2 mm (0.039–0.079 in) wide on a petiole 0.3–0.5 mm (0.012–0.020 in) long. The flowers are usually 12–14 mm (0.47–0.55 in) in diameter, each flower on a pedicel 0.5–1.5 mm (0.020–0.059 in) long. The floral tube is 2–3 mm (0.079–0.118 in) long and 3.5–4.5 mm (0.14–0.18 in) wide and the sepals are often difficult to see, 0.5–0.8 mm (0.020–0.031 in) long and 2–3 mm (0.079–0.118 in) wide. The petals are white, 4–5 mm (0.16–0.20 in) long with 22 to 24 stamens. Flowering has been recorded from early September to November, and the fruit is a capsule 4–6 mm (0.16–0.24 in) long and 5–6 mm (0.20–0.24 in) wide.

== Taxonomy ==
Balaustion baiocalyx was first formally described in 2022 by Barbara Lynette Rye in the journal Nuytsia from specimens collected in 1937 between Bencubbin and Koorda by William Blackall. The specific epithet (baiocalyx) means 'small calyx', referring to the small sepals.

== Distribution and habitat ==
This species of Balaustion has been recorded in low shrubland in sand between Kalannie, Dowerin and Koorda in the Avon Wheatbelt bioregion of south-western Western Australia.

== Conservation status ==
Balaustion baiocalyx is listed as "Priority One" by the Government of Western Australia Department of Biodiversity, Conservation and Attractions, meaning that it is known from only one or a few locations where it is potentially at risk.
