= Balaustion tangerinum =

Conservation status
- Priority One — Poorly Known Taxa (DEC)

Scientific classification
- Kingdom: Plantae
- Clade: Tracheophytes
- Clade: Angiosperms
- Clade: Eudicots
- Clade: Rosids
- Order: Myrtales
- Family: Myrtaceae
- Genus: Balaustion
- Species: B. tangerinum

Binomial name
- Balaustion tangerinum Rye

Species of flowering plant

Balaustion tangerinum is a species of flowering plant in the family Myrtaceae and is endemic to a restricted part of the south-west of Western Australia. It is shrub with oblong or egg-shaped leaves with the narrower end towards the base, and orange flowers with about 24 stamens.

== Description ==
Balaustion tangerinum is a shrub, the flowering branchlets with one or two flowers. Its leaves are oblong or egg-shaped with the narrower end towards the base, 3.5–4.5 mm (0.14–0.18 in) long and 1.5–1.6 mm (0.059–0.063 in) wide on a petiole 0.5–0.7 mm (0.020–0.028 in) long. The lower surface of the leaves is narrowly keeled near the tip with usually two or three main rows of oil glands each side of the midvein. The flowers are 20–25 mm (0.79–0.98 in) in diameter and sessile on a peduncle 3–4 mm (0.12–0.16 in) long. The floral tube is 3–4 mm (0.12–0.16 in) long and 6–8 mm (0.24–0.31 in) wide, the free part 1.5–2.0 mm (0.059–0.079 in) long and greenish-orange to reddish. The sepals are egg-shaped, about 3 mm (0.12 in) long, 4.0–5.5 mm (0.16–0.22 in) wide and usually green, with a toothed, whitish or pink-tinged edge. The petals are orange, 9–10 mm (0.35–0.39 in) long, with about 24 stamens. Flowering has been recorded in early September.

== Taxonomy ==
Balaustion tangerinum was first formally described in 2022 by Barbara Lynette Rye in the journal Nuytsia from specimens collected by Andrew Phillip Brown near Diemals in 1999. The specific epithet (tangerinum) means 'orange', referring to the colour of the petals.

== Distribution and habitat ==
This species of Balaustion grows on sandplain, and is only known from the type location near diemals in the Yalgoo bioregion in the south-west of Western Australia.

== Conservation status ==
Balaustion spenceri is listed as "Priority One" by the Government of Western Australia Department of Biodiversity, Conservation and Attractions, meaning that it is known from only one or a few locations where it is potentially at risk.
