= Balaustion karroun =

Conservation status
- Priority One — Poorly Known Taxa (DEC)

Scientific classification
- Kingdom: Plantae
- Clade: Tracheophytes
- Clade: Angiosperms
- Clade: Eudicots
- Clade: Rosids
- Order: Myrtales
- Family: Myrtaceae
- Genus: Balaustion
- Species: B. karroun

Binomial name
- Balaustion karroun Rye

Species of flowering plant

Balaustion karroun is a species of flowering plant in the family Myrtaceae and is endemic to inland Western Australia. It is a shrub with egg-shaped leaves, the narrower end towards the base, and white flowers with usually 22 to 25 stamens.

== Description ==
Balaustion karroun is a shrub that typically grows to 40–50 cm (16–20 in) high and about 50 cm (20 in) wide. Its leaves are egg-shaped with the narrower end towards the base, 2.5–3.7 mm (0.098–0.146 in) long and 1.4–1.6 mm (0.055–0.063 in) wide with two or three rows of oil glands each side of the midvein. The flowers are about 15 mm (0.59 in) in diameter, each flower on a pedicel 3.0–3.5 mm (0.12–0.14 in) long. The floral tube is 2.5–3.5 mm (0.098–0.138 in) long and 4–5 mm (0.16–0.20 in) wide, green and often tinged with red. The sepals are broadly egg-shaped, 2.0–2.5 mm (0.079–0.098 in) long, 4–5 mm (0.16–0.20 in) wide and reddish with a narrow whitish border. The petals are white, about 5 mm (0.20 in) long, usually with 22 to 25 stamens. Flowering occurs in October and November, and the fruit is a capsule 4.0–4.5 mm (0.16–0.18 in) long and about 6 mm (0.24 in) in diameter.

== Taxonomy ==
Balaustion karroun was first formally described in 2022 by Barbara Lynette Rye in the journal Nuytsia from specimens collected near Bonnie Rock in 1984. The specific epithet (karroun) refers to the Karroun Hill Nature Reserve. All records of this species have been made within 40 km (25 mi) of this reserve.

== Distribution and habitat ==
This species of Balaustion grows in sandy soils between Diemals Station and Wialki in the Avon Wheatbelt, Coolgardie and Yalgoo bioregions of Western Australia.

== Conservation status ==
Balaustion karroun is listed as "Priority One" by the Government of Western Australia Department of Biodiversity, Conservation and Attractions, meaning that it is known from only one or a few locations where it is potentially at risk.
