= Balaustion interruptum =

Scientific classification
- Kingdom: Plantae
- Clade: Tracheophytes
- Clade: Angiosperms
- Clade: Eudicots
- Clade: Rosids
- Order: Myrtales
- Family: Myrtaceae
- Genus: Balaustion
- Species: B. interruptum

Binomial name
- Balaustion interruptum Rye

Species of flowering plant

Balaustion interruptum is a species of flowering plant in the family Myrtaceae and is endemic to the south-west of Western Australia. It is a shrub with oblong to narrowly oblong or egg-shaped leaves with the narrower end towards the base, and white or pale pink flowers with 13 to 20 widely spaced stamens.

== Description ==
Balaustion interruptum is a shrub that typically grows to 30–80 cm (12–31 in) high, rarely up 1.7 m (5 ft 7 in) high, and usually 50–80 cm (20–31 in) wide. Its leaves are oblong to narrowly oblong or egg-shaped with the narrower end towards the base, 1.3–2.5 mm (0.051–0.098 in) long, 0.5–1.3 mm (0.020–0.051 in) wide and 0.5–0.7 mm (0.020–0.028 in) thick with a deeply convex lower surface and two or three rows of oil glands either side of the midvein. The flowers are 8–12 mm (0.31–0.47 in) in diameter, each flower on a pedicel 0.5–1.5 mm (0.020–0.059 in) long. The floral tube is broadly cone shaped, 1.5–1.8 mm (0.059–0.071 in) long and 2.0–2.5 mm (0.079–0.098 in) wide and the sepals are egg-shaped, 0.5–0.9 mm (0.020–0.035 in) long, 1.3–1.6 mm (0.051–0.063 in) wide and often greenish. The petals are white or pale pink, 3.0–4.75 mm (0.118–0.187 in) long, 2.75–4.75 mm (0.108–0.187 in) wide with 13 to 20 widely spaced stamens. Flowering mainly occurs from August to October, and the fruit is a capsule about 2 mm (0.079 in) long and 2.5 mm (0.098 in) in diameter.

== Taxonomy ==
Balaustion interruptum was first formally described in 2022 by Barbara Lynette Rye in the journal Nuytsia from specimens collected on the Dowerin-Kalannie Road north-west of Dowerin in 2021. The specific epithet (interruptum) means 'broken in pieces' or 'interrupted', referring to gaps between the stamens.

== Distribution and habitat ==
This species of Balaustion grows in sandy soils between Petrudor Rocks Reserve and Wyalkatchem with an isolated occurrence near Mukinbudin, in the Avon Wheatbelt bioregion.

== Conservation status ==
Balaustion interruptum is listed as "not threatened" by the Government of Western Australia Department of Biodiversity, Conservation and Attractions.
