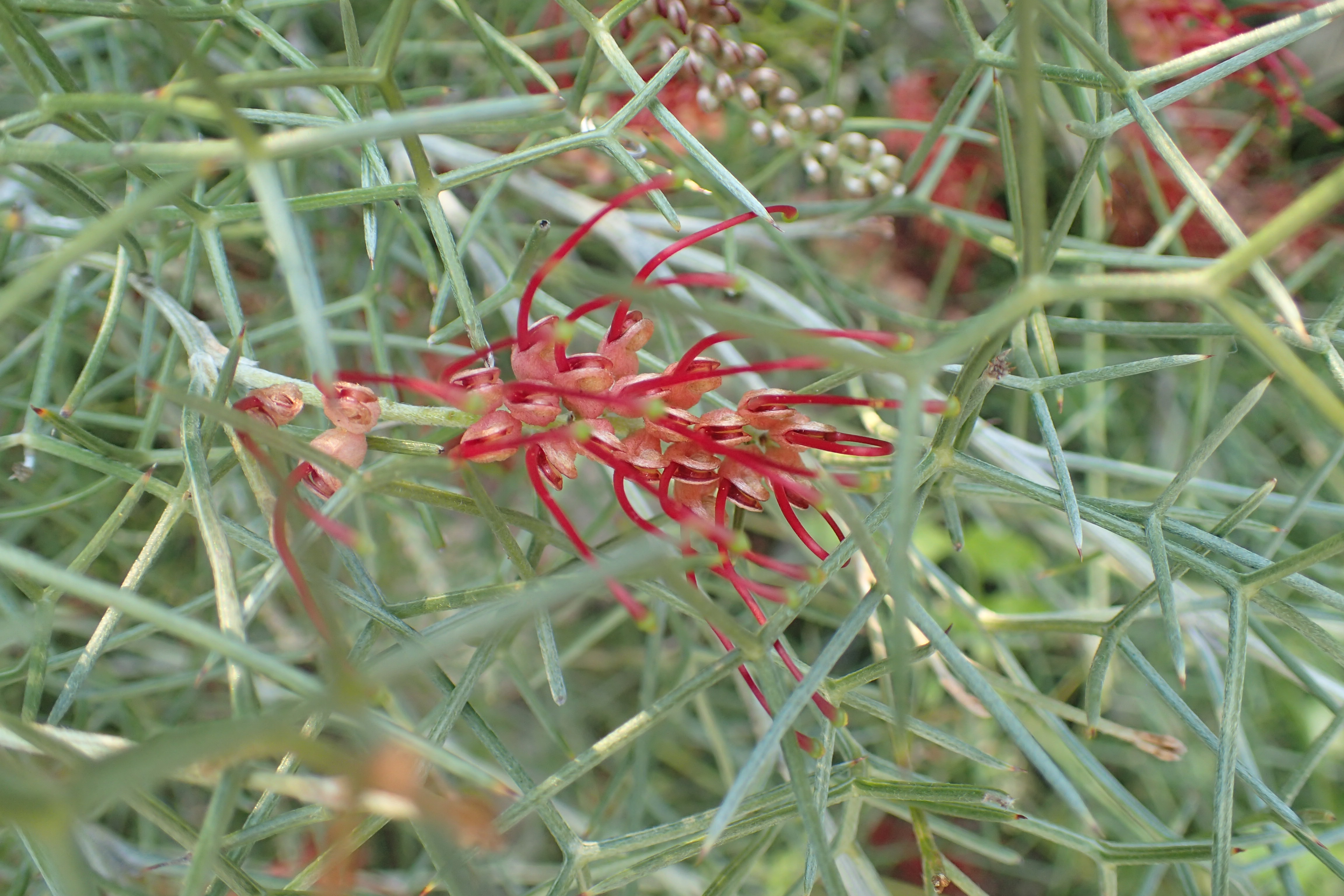

Conservation status
- Priority One — Poorly Known Taxa (DEC)

Scientific classification
- Kingdom: Plantae
- Clade: Tracheophytes
- Clade: Angiosperms
- Clade: Eudicots
- Order: Proteales
- Family: Proteaceae
- Genus: Grevillea
- Species: G. squiresiae

Binomial name
- Grevillea squiresiae Olde & Marriott

= Grevillea squiresiae =

Species of shrub endemic to Western Australia

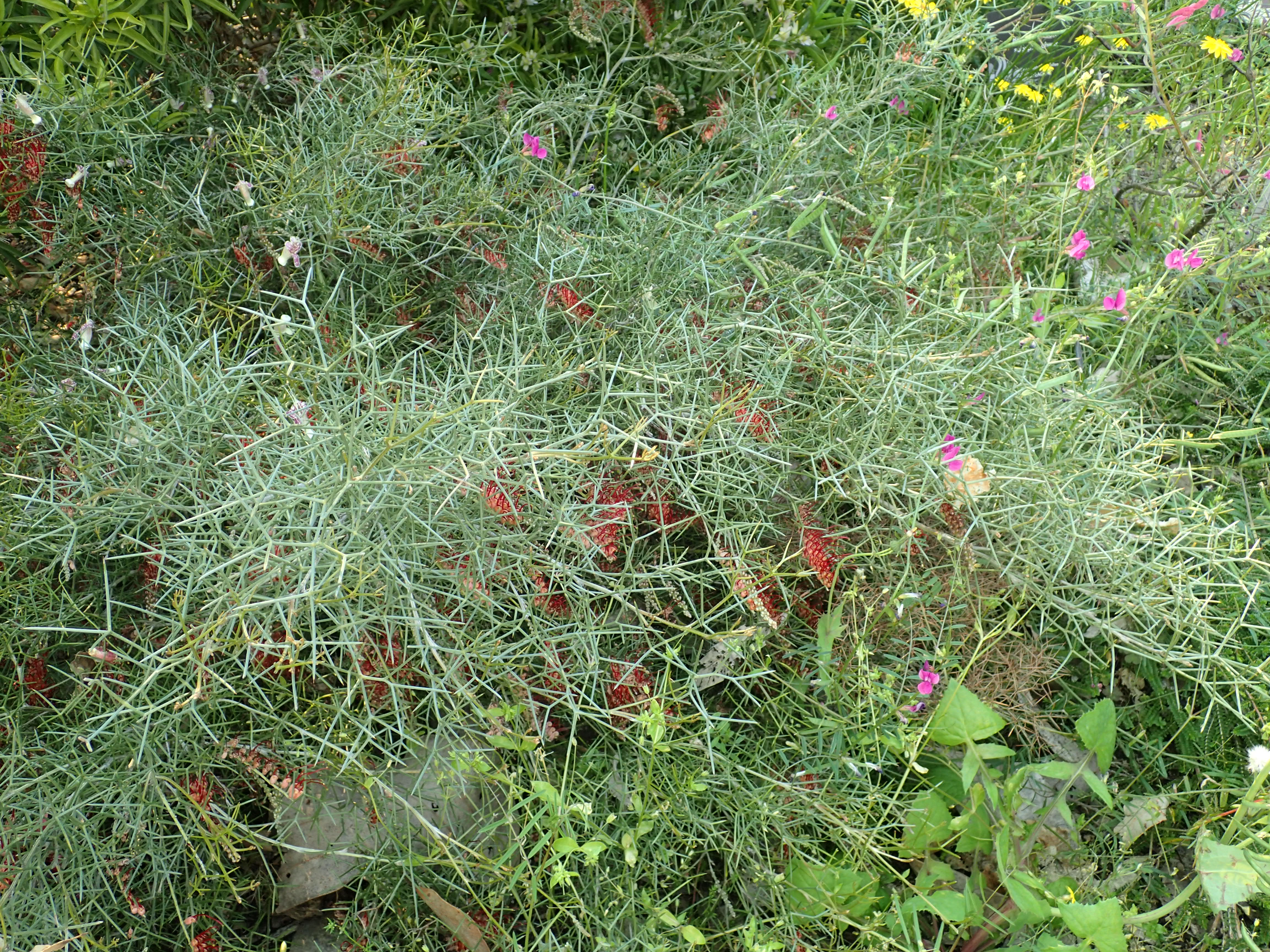
Habit in Kings Park, Perth

Grevillea squiresiae is a species of flowering plant in the family Proteaceae and is endemic to a small area in the Avon Wheatbelt region of Western Australia. It is a single-stemmed shrub, usually with pinnatipartite leaves, the end lobes more or less linear, and clusters of red flowers.

== Description ==
Grevillea squiresiae is a shrub that typically grows up to 1 m (3 ft 3 in) high and wide, with a single stem at the base. The leaves are mostly pinnatipartite, sessile, 45–105 mm (1.8–4.1 in) long with 3 to 5 lobes usually divided again, the end lobes more or less cylindrical, 14–40 mm (0.55–1.57 in) long and 0.5–1.3 mm (0.020–0.051 in) wide. Both surfaces of the leaves are more or less glabrous and leathery. The flowers are arranged in sometimes branched clusters on the ends of branches, each flower on a pedicel 2.0–3.5 mm (0.079–0.138 in) long. The flowers are red with a red style, the pistil 28–29 mm (1.10–1.14 in) long. Flowering occurs from September to December and the fruit is an oval, silky-hairy follicle about 15 mm (0.59 in) long.

== Taxonomy and naming ==
Grevillea squiresiae was first formally described in 2002 by Peter M. Olde and Neil R. Marriott in the journal Nuytsia from specimens they collected east of Mukinbudin in 1999. The species was discovered by Mary Squire, a farmer and conservationist for whom it is named. The specific epithet is correctly spelled squiresiae not squiresae as the name appeared in the original publication, are honours the discoverer of the species.

== Distribution and habitat ==
This grevillea has a limited range, growing on hills, slopes and road verges near Mukinbudin in the Avon Wheatbelt bioregion of south-western Western Australia.

== Conservation status ==
Grevillea squiresiae is listed as "Priority One" by the Government of Western Australia Department of Biodiversity, Conservation and Attractions, meaning that it is known from only one or a few locations that are potentially at risk.

== See also ==
- List of Grevillea species
