= Balaustion grande =

Conservation status
- Priority Three — Poorly Known Taxa (DEC)

Scientific classification
- Kingdom: Plantae
- Clade: Tracheophytes
- Clade: Angiosperms
- Clade: Eudicots
- Clade: Rosids
- Order: Myrtales
- Family: Myrtaceae
- Genus: Balaustion
- Species: B. grande

Binomial name
- Balaustion grande (E.Pritz.) Rye

Synonyms
- Baeckea grandis E.Pritz.

Species of flowering plant

Balaustion grande is a species of flowering plant in the family Myrtaceae and is endemic to the south-west of Western Australia. It is a low-growing shrub with oblong or narrowly oblong leaves and usually white or pale pink flowers with 16 to 28 stamens fused in a ring.

== Description ==
Balaustion grande is a low-growing shrub that typically grows to 40–50 cm (16–20 in) high and 20–100 cm (7.9–39.4 in) wide. Its leaves are oblong or narrowly oblong, often clustered, mostly 2–4 mm (0.079–0.157 in) long and 0.5–1 mm (0.020–0.039 in) wide and sessile or on a petiole up to 0.3 mm (0.012 in) long. The flowers are 8–13 mm (0.31–0.51 in) in diameter and borne in up to 6 pairs, each flower on a pedicel 6–8.5 mm (0.24–0.33 in) long. The floral tube is 1.0–1.5 mm (0.039–0.059 in) long and 1.75–3.5 mm (0.069–0.138 in) wide and the sepals are egg-shaped and deep maroon, 1.3–3 mm (0.051–0.118 in) long and 2.3–3.5 mm (0.091–0.138 in) wide. The petals are usually white or pale pink, rarely pink, and 2.5–6 mm (0.098–0.236 in) long with 16 to 28 stamens fused in a ring. Flowering has been recorded from July to October, and the fruit is a capsule 1.0–1.4 mm (0.039–0.055 in) long and 0.55–0.65 mm (0.022–0.026 in) wide.

This species is distinguished from other species of Balaustion by it stamens that are fused at their bases, and from its pedicels that are much longer than its peduncles.

== Taxonomy ==
This species was first formally described in 1904 by the Ernst Georg Pritzel who gave it the name Baeckea grandis in Engler's journal Botanische Jahrbücher für Systematik, Pflanzengeschichte und Pflanzengeographie in an article by Pritzel and Ludwig Diels entitled Fragmenta Phytographiae Australiae occidentalis. In 2022, Barbara Lynette Rye transferred the species to Balaustion as B. grande in the journal Nuytsia. The specific epithet (grande) is from the Latin grandis meaning 'great, large or tall'.

== Distribution and habitat ==
Balaustion grande grows on sand-plains between Bookara near the Greenough River to Wongan Hills in the Avon Wheatbelt, Geraldton Sandplains and Swan Coastal Plain bioregions of south-western Western Australia.

== Conservation status ==
This species of Balaustion is listed as "Priority Three" by the Government of Western Australia Department of Biodiversity, Conservation and Attractions meaning that it is poorly known and known from only a few locations but is not under imminent threat.
