= Kirkalocka =

Pastoral lease in Western Australia

Coordinates: 28.55663°S 117.77996°E

Location in Western Australia

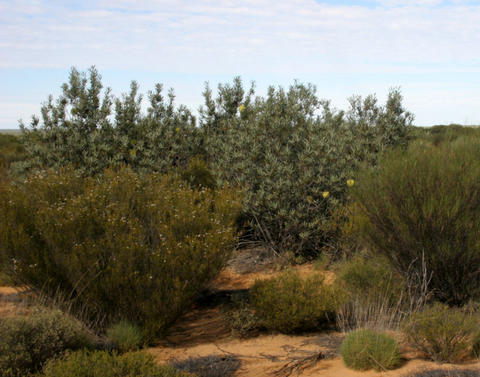
Banksia rosserae plants on Kirkalocka

Kirkalocka is a former sheep station in the Mid West region of Western Australia.

== Location ==
It is located 55 kilometres (35 mi) south-south-west of Mount Magnet, 420 kilometres (260 mi) north east of Perth. The station covers approximately 100 square kilometres (25,000 acres) of leasehold land.

== History ==
A road was cleared from Mount Magnet to Kirkalocka Station in 1911.

At a meeting of the Mt Magnet Pastoralists subcommittee in 1944 at Kirkalocka they were given a demonstration of mulesing and the docking of lambs tails to prevent fly strike. In 1949 Grazier Fred Broad recommend the Manchester method in preference to mulesing, having used it for 3 years on 1200 ewes at Kirkalocka with a 99% success rate and attributing the 1% failure to poor workmanship.

Kirkalocka is now predominantly a tourism based operation and offers caravan stop-over facilities and accommodation in shearers' quarters and the old homestead.

In 2000, three previously undescribed species of shrub were collected on the station, and subsequently published as Banksia rosserae, Grevillea squiresiae and Grevillea kirkalocka. The last of these is named after Kirkalocka.

Due to proximity to mining areas, the station area was reviewed for its geological potential in 2000.

Badimaya elder Ollie George grew up on the station.

A dictionary preserving the Badimaya language was unveiled at Kirkalocka station in 2014.

The current lessees are Jared and Blair Ridley; Kirkalocka is operating under the Crown Lease number CL440-1966 and has the Land Act number LA3114/636.

== See also ==
- Kirkalocka Gold Mine
