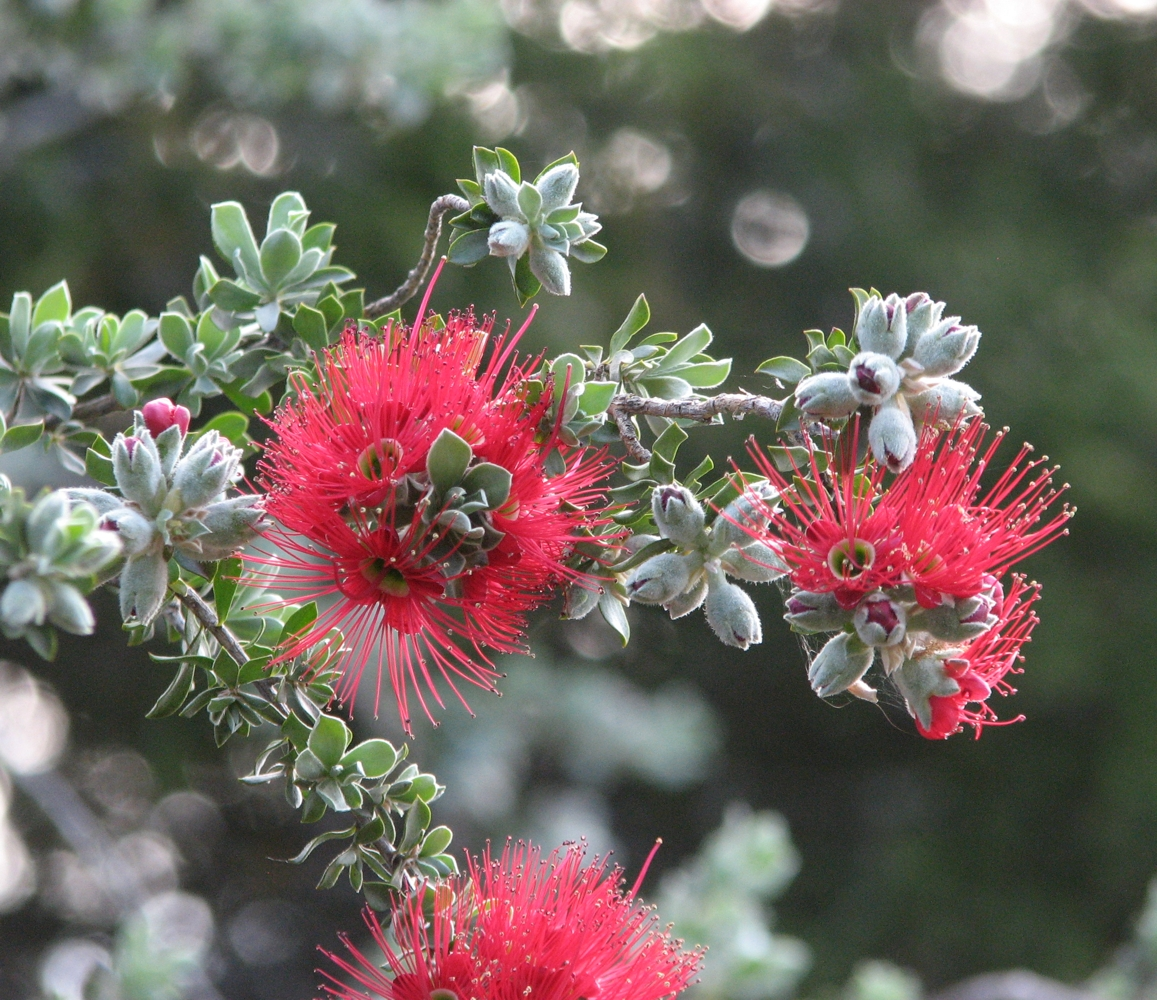

Scientific classification
- Kingdom: Plantae
- Clade: Tracheophytes
- Clade: Angiosperms
- Clade: Eudicots
- Clade: Rosids
- Order: Myrtales
- Family: Myrtaceae
- Genus: Kunzea
- Species: K. pulchella

Binomial name
- Kunzea pulchella (Lindl.) A.S.George

Synonyms
- Kunzea pulchella var. albiflora S.Moore nom. inval.; Kunzea sericea Turcz.; Kunzea sericea var. albiflora S.Moore; Kunzea sericea var. glabra C.A.Gardner; Kunzea sericea Turcz. var. sericea; Salisia pulchella Lindl.

= Kunzea pulchella =

Granite kunzea

Species of flowering plant

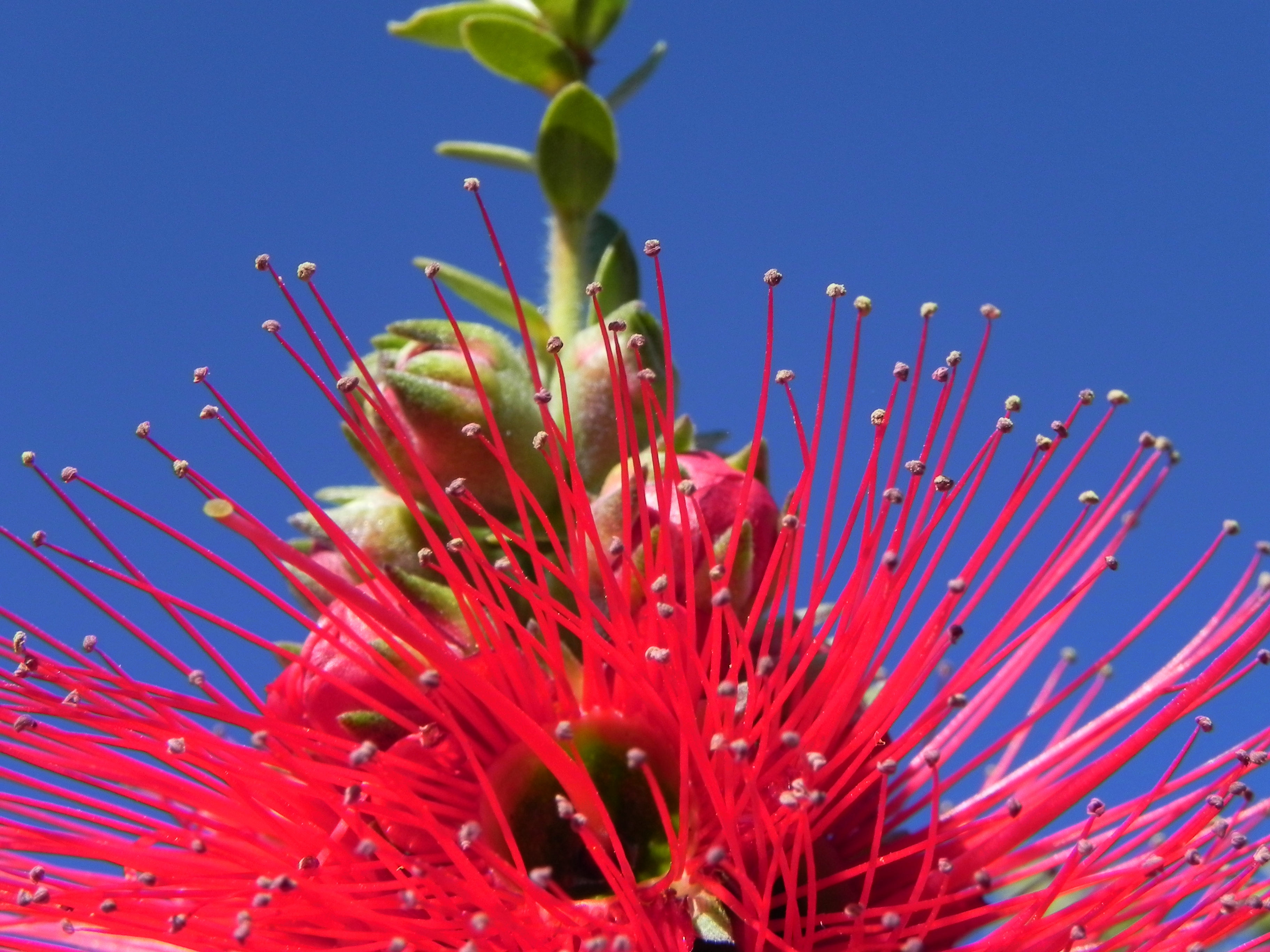

Kunzea pulchella, commonly known as granite kunzea, is a flowering plant in the myrtle family, Myrtaceae and is endemic to the south-west of Western Australia. It is a shrub with spreading branches, egg-shaped to lance-shaped leaves and loose groups of red flowers, each on a short stalk so that the branch is visible between the flowers.

== Description ==
Kunzea pulchella is a spreading shrub which usually grows to a height of between 0.6 and 3 m (2 and 10 ft), often with few side-branches, the branches more or less hairy. The leaves are arranged alternately on a petiole up to 1 mm (0.04 in) long and have a leaf blade that is usually 5–14 mm (0.2–0.6 in) long, 2.5–5.5 mm (0.1–0.2 in) wide and egg-shaped to lance-shaped with the narrower end towards the base. Both sides of the leaves are silky-hairy.

The flowers are arranged in loose groups of 6 to 14, each flower on a stalk 2.5–4.5 mm (0.1–0.2 in) long on the ends of branches which often continue to grow during the flowering period. There are leaf-like, egg-shaped bracts 4.5–6 mm (0.18–0.24 in) long and smaller bracteoles at the base of the flower and which fall off as the flower develops. The hypanthium is 4–5 mm (0.16–0.20 in) long and densely hairy on the outside. There are five hairy, pointed, triangular sepals 2–3.5 mm (0.08–0.1 in) long, which remain on the maturing fruit. The five petals are deep red, almost round and 3.5–5 mm (0.1–0.2 in) long. There are more than 70 bright red stamens 10–17 mm (0.4–0.7 in) long around each flower, the stamens three or four times as long as the petals. Some forms of the plant have white to pale cream-coloured flowers. Flowering occurs from June to November and is followed by fruit which is a broad, urn-shaped capsule, 4–5 mm (0.16–0.20 in) long with the erect sepals attached. The features of this species that distinguish it from others in the Myrtaceae are the red flowers, persistent sepals and deciduous fruit. The egg-shaped leaves and triangular sepals distinguish it from Kunzea baxteri which also has red flowers.

The colour of the flowers is white in the east of the range, and pink forms occur at a north–south transition zone that includes Elachbutting, Frog Rock and Duladjin Rock. The white form may encourage pollination by nocturnal moths, supplementing the less reliable visits by the honeyeaters in the more arid region,

== Taxonomy and naming ==
The species was first formally described in 1839 by John Lindley, who gave it the name Salisia pulchella and published the description in A Sketch of the Vegetation of the Swan River Colony. In 1966, Alex George revised the name to Kunzea pulchella and published the change in The Western Australian Naturalist. The specific epithet (pulchella) is the diminutive of the Latin word pulcher meaning "pretty", hence "beautiful little".

== Distribution and habitat ==
Kunzea pulchella grows in sandy or clay soils, often near or over granite in open scrub. The species occurs at the granite outcrops of Western Australia, and amongst the most common shrubs of those features in the more arid wheatbelt and goldfields areas of the southwest region. The preferred site is a narrow fissure in granite, to which it will be tenaciously anchored. The species may assume a bonsai appearance as the aging sole resident of a minor flaw on the face of a granite outcrop.

It grows over a widespread area in the Avon Wheatbelt, Coolgardie, Jarrah Forest, Mallee, Murchison and Yalgoo biogeographic regions.

== Use in horticulture ==
This kunzea is best suited to a climate with dry summers and wet winters but can be grown in eastern Australian states if grown from cuttings on Kunzea ambigua rootstock.

== Conservation ==
Granite kunzea is classified as "not threatened" by the Department of Parks and Wildlife of Western Australia.
