= Hartley Teakle =

Australian Professor of Agriculture

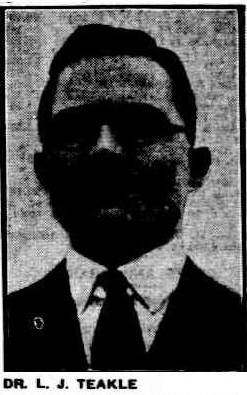
Hartley Teakle c. 1930

Laurence John Hartley Teakle CMG (2 August 1901 – 8 December 1979) was Professor of Agriculture from 1947 until 1963 at the University of Queensland in Brisbane, Australia.

He was born in Hawker, South Australia, grew up near Geraldton, Western Australia, and was educated at Perth Modern School followed by the University of Western Australia. He was awarded the Amy Saw scholarship and completed a year's research work at the University of California at Berkeley.

In around 1928 he was employed at the State Department of Agriculture as a plant nutrition officer. His expertise lay particularly into soil quality and structure. In the 1930s he was responsible for authoring a report on soils salinity that put an end to the 3500 Farms Scheme in the eastern Wheatbelt region of Western Australia.

From 1946 to 1947 he was the Western Australian commissioner for soil conservation. He was a contentious commissioner for his statements that some marginal parts of the state should not be settled. In 1964 he was appointed deputy vice chancellor of the university and in 1969 he was awarded an honorary Doctorate of Laws.

He undertook work throughout Australia including for the National Capital Development Commission in Canberra in 1966 to determine whether forests could be harvested and still protect water quality. This was groundbreaking work.

He retired from the university in 1970. The Hartley Teakle building at the University of Queensland is named after him. He was married and had one daughter and three sons. He is grandfather to birth activist, Bruce Teakle. He is buried at the Pinaroo Lawn Cemetery, Aspley, Brisbane.

== Bibliography ==
- Fertilizers for the Farm and Garden, Teakle and R. A. Boyd, Sydney 1958
