= 3500 Farms Scheme =

Land development scheme in Western Australia

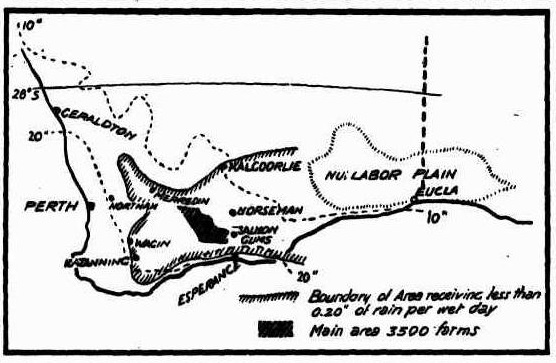
Map of southern WA showing the area to be settled by the 3500 Farms Scheme

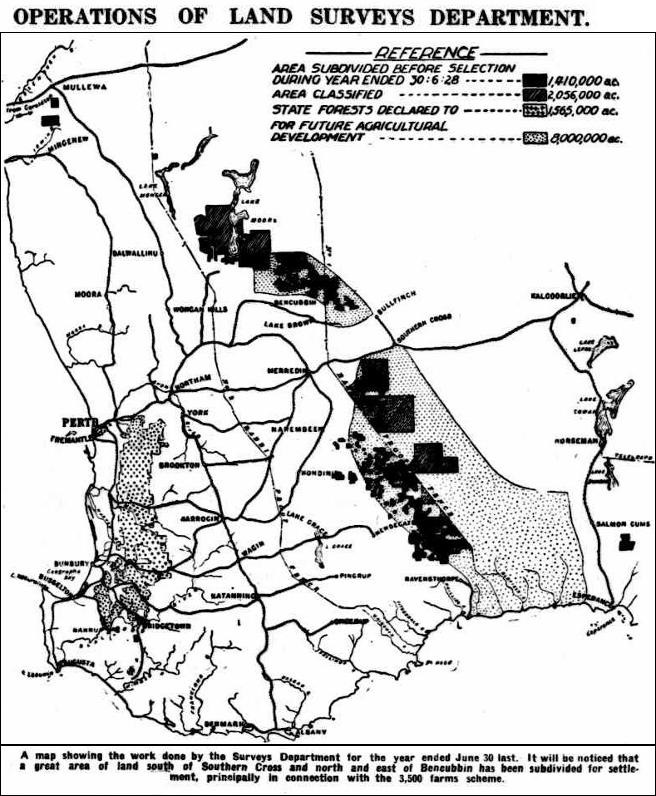
1927 land survey showing land selected and available

The 3500 Farms Scheme was a land development scheme to settle areas in the eastern Wheatbelt region of Western Australia south of Southern Cross in the late 1920s and early 1930s.

== Planning ==
The idea was first proposed in 1925, with planning originating in 1928 to settle an area of about 8,000,000 acres (3,200,000 ha), 1,000,000 acres (400,000 ha) east of Mollerin and 7,000,000 acres (2,800,000 ha) south of Southern Cross and east of the Great Southern Railway on a total of 3,500 separate farms. A conference was held in Perth to discuss the plan in detail, including the Premier Philip Collier, the Minister of Lands, and Edward Mulvany of the Development and Migration Commission. Collier completed his proposal for the Federal Government in July 1929.

The scheme was a result of a tri-party arrangement between the State, Federal and Imperial Governments, with approval from the Development and Migration Commission. It was envisaged that the scheme would produce some 12 million bushels of wheat annually and graze an extra million sheep. It was estimated an additional 650 mi (1,050 km) of railways and 3,000 mi (4,800 km) of roads would be required. The total cost of the project was estimated at over £4 million; it would employ some 2,000 men. A 1929 survey indicated that farmers having sufficient water would be an issue. It also found that the area from Norseman to Newdegate had an elevation of 900 to 1,400 ft (270 to 430 m) above sea level with a scattering of higher peaks and knolls. The land sloped south of the Goldfields Railway towards the south coast and was drained by saline depressions and rivers to the coast. The main depressions in the area were in the form of salt lakes or "lake country". Around 90% of the area is underlain by granite and soil formed from these rocks. There are numerous granite outcrops, some as large as several hundred acres. There was little jointing in the granite, meaning that boring for sub-surface water would be near impossible.

== Salinity ==
Hartley Teakle produced a paper on alkali soils in 1928 and 1929. The report was released in early 1930 by Collier, causing much consternation in the state parliament. Professor James Arthur Prescott of the Council for Scientific and Industrial Research (later to become the CSIRO) confirmed Teakle's views on the inappropriateness of developing 3500 farms in his report released early in 1931.

== Abandonment ==
The scheme was abandoned in 1930 by Great Britain due to natural soil salinity and a cause of further dryland salinity. The decision to abandon the scheme was also due to the commencement of the Great Depression rather than just the predicted salt problems. The decision to abandon the scheme was strongly criticised when it was made, mostly by existing settlers in the adjoining Lakes District.
