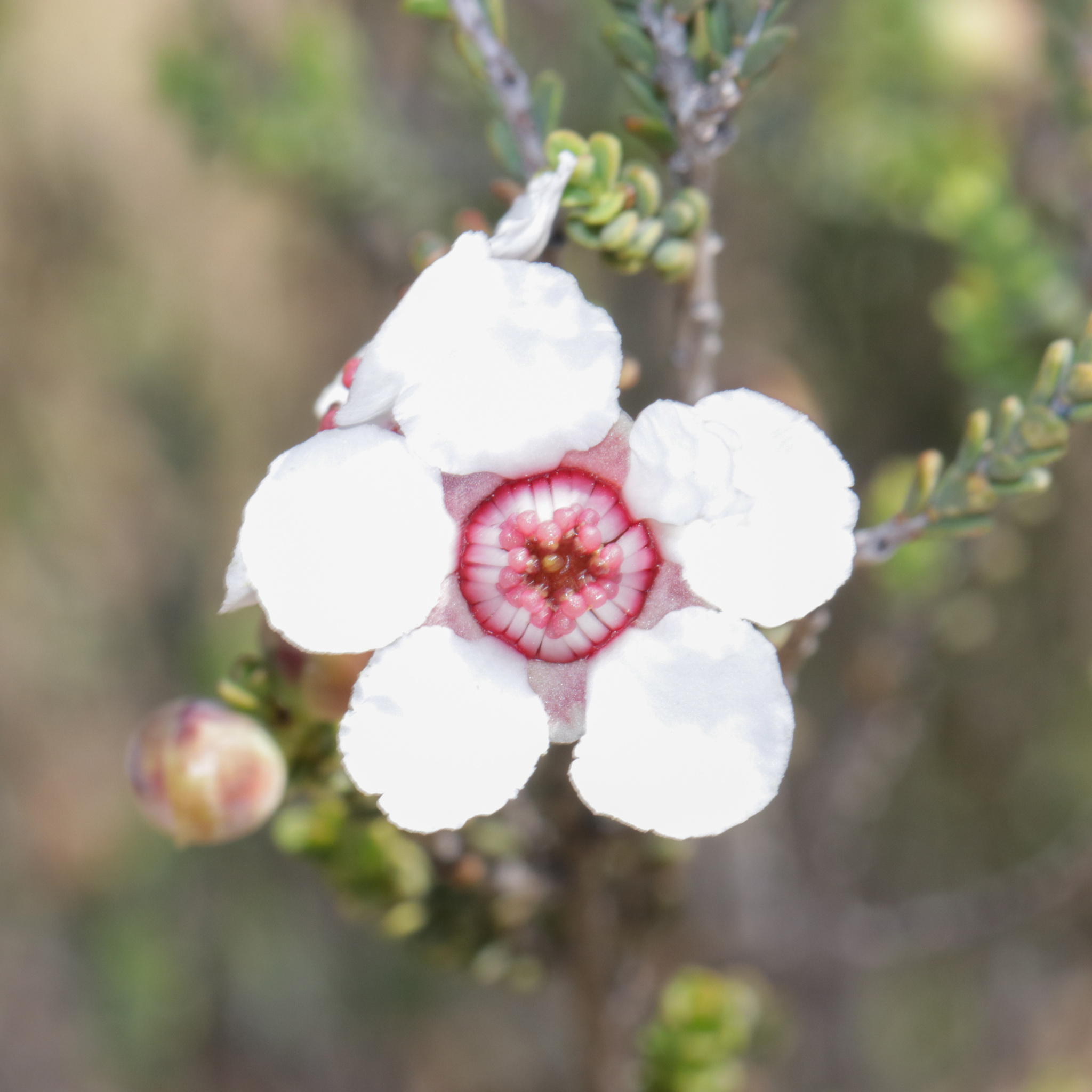
- Balaustion mukinbudin

Scientific classification
- Kingdom: Plantae
- Clade: Tracheophytes
- Clade: Angiosperms
- Clade: Eudicots
- Clade: Rosids
- Order: Myrtales
- Family: Myrtaceae
- Subfamily: Myrtoideae
- Tribe: Chamelaucieae
- Genus: Balaustion; Hook.

Synonyms
- Balaustium Kuntze orth. var.; Cheynia J.Drumm. ex Harv.; Punicella Turcz.

= Balaustion =

Genus of flowering plants

Balaustion is a genus of flowering plants in the myrtle family, Myrtaceae and is endemic to Western Australia.

== Description ==
Plants in the genus Balaustion are glabrous, prostrate to erect shrubs with flowering branchlets with up to six pairs of flowers. The leaves are arranged in opposite pairs and decussate, linear to more or less circular with oil glands on the lower surface. The flower clusters are borne on a peduncle, each flower sessile or on a long pedicel. There are five sepals that are shorter than the petals and five egg-shaped to broadly elliptic petals with 13 to 35 stamens. The fruit is a slightly kidney-shaped capsule with a rounded outer surface with two equal lateral surfaces and a large inner surface 1.2–2.6 mm (0.047–0.102 in) long.

== Taxonomy ==
The genus Balaustion was first described by William Jackson Hooker in his Icones Plantarum, and the first species he described (the type species) was Balaustion pulcherrimum.

== Species ==
The following species of Balaustion are accepted by Plants of the World Online as at November 2024:

- Balaustion baiocalyx Rye
- Balaustion bimucronatum Rye
- Balaustion exsertum (S.Moore) Rye
- Balaustion filifolium Rye
- Balaustion grande (E.Pritz.) Rye
- Balaustion grandibracteatum (E.Pritz.) Rye
- Balaustion hemisphaericum Rye
- Balaustion interruptum Rye
- Balaustion karroun Rye
- Balaustion mukinbudin Rye
- Balaustion multicaule Rye
- Balaustion polyandrum Rye
- Balaustion pulcherrimum Hook.
- Balaustion quinquelobum Rye
- Balaustion spenceri Rye
- Balaustion tangerinum Rye
- Balaustion thamnoides Rye
- Balaustion unguiculatum Rye
