= List of rocks in Western Australia (C–E) =

This list includes all gazetted rocks, boulders, pinnacles, crags, needles, pillars, rock formations, and tors in Western Australia, both inland and offshore. It does not include monoliths gazetted as mounts or hills, such as Mount Augustus. It is complete with respect to the 1996 Gazetteer of Australia. Dubious names have been checked against the online 2004 data, and in all cases confirmed correct. However, if any rocks have been gazetted or deleted since 1996, this list does not reflect these changes. Strictly speaking, Australian place names are gazetted in capital letters only; the names in this list have been converted to mixed case in accordance with normal capitalisation conventions. Locations are as gazetted; some large rock formations may extend over large areas.

See List of rocks in Western Australia for more.

== C ==
| Name | Coordinates | Remarks |
|---|---|---|
| Cabbage Tree Rock | 31°8′21″S 116°55′34″E | |
| Cadjybin Rock | 30°46′38″S 117°51′44″E | |
| Caenyie Rock | 30°45′22″S 120°41′42″E | |
| Caesar Rock | 16°4′56″S 123°55′21″E | |
| Calyerup Rocks | 33°54′22″S 119°5′2″E | |
| Camel Peaks | 32°18′32″S 118°49′17″E | |
| Camel Rock | 15°15′0″S 128°12′17″E | |
| Canal Rocks | 33°40′8″S 114°59′36″E | |
| Cape Pillar Rock | 34°11′59″S 123°36′58″E | |
| Captain Roe Rock | 32°26′24″S 118°40′9″E | |
| Carcunning Rock | 33°6′52″S 117°24′13″E | |
| Cardunia Rocks | 30°55′32″S 122°33′17″E | |
| Carlibuin Rock | 27°14′0″S 117°23′47″E | |
| Carlyarn Rock | 30°5′18″S 117°27′12″E | |
| Caroling Rock | 31°15′59″S 119°48′58″E | |
| Caroling Rocks | 31°16′47″S 119°49′8″E | |
| Carr Boyd Rocks | 30°2′33″S 121°43′16″E | |
| Carr-boyd Rocks | 28°10′34″S 124°25′33″E | |
| Carraning Rock | 32°21′26″S 122°1′49″E | |
| Carribin Rock | 31°21′21″S 117°29′13″E | |
| Cartamulligan Rock | 31°29′18″S 116°45′8″E | |
| Cashel Rock | 27°33′25″S 115°48′34″E | |
| Castle Rock | 34°41′46″S 117°55′7″E | |
| Castle Rock | 33°35′5″S 115°5′59″E | |
| Castle Rock | 27°40′53″S 114°9′19″E | |
| Castle Rock | 31°40′51″S 116°59′7″E | |
| Cathedral Rocks | 32°1′12″S 115°26′52″E | |
| Celia Rocks | 32°0′46″S 115°27′33″E | |
| Centre Rock | 14°19′38″S 125°56′31″E | |
| Chadadoomunoo Rocks | 21°44′6″S 116°2′46″E | |
| Challenger Rock | 32°8′28″S 115°38′52″E | |
| Challis Rocks | 15°52′8″S 123°42′27″E | |
| Champion Rock | 32°1′47″S 115°36′18″E | |
| Chanake | 15°35′19″S 125°1′24″E | |
| Channel Rock | 18°0′48″S 122°12′46″E | |
| Channel Rock | 20°45′32″S 115°29′55″E | |
| Channel Rock | 15°9′42″S 128°6′59″E | |
| Channel Rock | 16°26′25″S 123°22′44″E | |
| Channel Rocks | 30°16′51″S 115°2′12″E | |
| Charlina Granite Rock | 32°37′3″S 123°21′43″E | |
| Cheetara Rock | 22°33′4″S 115°9′35″E | |
| Chidalinya Rock | 32°17′57″S 123°43′57″E | |
| Chiggarrie Rock | 27°18′54″S 117°5′11″E | |
| Chimney Rocks | 16°45′42″S 122°34′52″E | |
| Chin Chin Rocks | 28°14′36″S 117°28′43″E | |
| Chinaman Rock | 28°0′7″S 116°48′23″E | |
| Chinamans Rock | 27°42′47″S 114°9′16″E | |
| Chinese Walls | 21°52′18″S 120°5′48″E | |
| Chingaling Rock | 29°30′43″S 120°20′54″E | |
| Chippers Leap | 31°54′1″S 116°3′57″E | |
| Choallie Rock | 27°14′13″S 117°23′7″E | |
| Chooweelarra Rock | 27°32′30″S 120°42′10″E | |
| Chubicquagup Rocks | 34°21′24″S 116°35′54″E | |
| Chugarlunginya Rock | 33°6′49″S 123°22′33″E | |
| Cleary Rocks | 30°22′46″S 117°39′11″E | |
| Cleft Rock | 24°48′33″S 113°9′55″E | |
| Cleland Rock | 21°13′49″S 119°10′56″E | |
| Cluster Rock | 33°55′21″S 122°48′33″E | |
| Coarin Rock | 31°56′15″S 117°45′6″E | |
| Coben Rock | 33°38′8″S 117°1′55″E | |
| Cockatoo Rock | 32°27′39″S 119°23′52″E | |
| Cockatoo Rocks | 29°56′38″S 121°46′59″E | |
| Cockatoo Rocks | 31°35′22″S 119°29′43″E | |
| Cockernabar Rocks | 28°50′32″S 117°44′45″E | |
| Coffin Rock | 32°4′13″S 116°35′57″E | |
| Coffin Rock | 31°1′28″S 118°36′43″E | |
| The Coffins | 30°24′36″S 114°58′59″E | |
| Cole Rock | 34°21′1″S 115°10′27″E | |
| Collanilling Rocks | 33°10′43″S 117°33′52″E | |
| Collier Rocks | 20°24′32″S 116°50′57″E | |
| Comber Rock | 16°6′27″S 123°39′25″E | |
| Comitun Rock | 31°47′52″S 118°5′27″E | |
| Commander Rocks | 33°13′57″S 119°32′44″E | |
| Condarnin Rock | 31°19′25″S 119°40′23″E | |
| Cone Rock | 16°24′25″S 123°27′46″E | |
| Conical Rock | 33°19′29″S 117°53′8″E | |
| Conway Patch | 31°50′33″S 118°13′40″E | |
| Cook Lump | 31°27′0″S 115°32′44″E | |
| Cook Rock | 33°53′16″S 121°54′22″E | |
| Cooladdie Rock | 29°52′47″S 120°28′16″E | |
| Coolanya Rock | 32°17′10″S 123°48′48″E | |
| Coombeloona Rock | 27°10′14″S 117°35′19″E | |
| Coomelberrup Rock | 33°26′56″S 117°46′58″E | |
| Cootarring Rock | 33°5′39″S 117°29′22″E | |
| Coragina Rock | 32°54′53″S 123°30′8″E | |
| Corling Rock | 31°17′21″S 119°46′0″E | |
| Cormorant Rock | 33°37′33″S 123°57′4″E | |
| Corriding Rock | 30°25′56″S 120°38′11″E | |
| Corrigin Rock | 32°19′34″S 117°53′15″E | |
| Cotthurst Rock | 14°25′9″S 125°10′41″E | |
| Cow and Calf Rocks | 35°0′44″S 116°12′59″E | |
| Cow Rock | 33°57′36″S 114°58′9″E | |
| Cow Rocks | 31°49′12″S 115°43′35″E | |
| Cowarna Rocks | 30°56′15″S 122°22′25″E | |
| Cowarning Rock | 30°51′35″S 120°32′23″E | |
| Crayfish Rock | 32°0′5″S 115°29′7″E | |
| Crocodile Rock | 29°52′47″S 114°58′35″E | |
| Crow Rock | 29°36′57″S 120°14′44″E | |
| Crystal Rock | 28°35′38″S 114°47′18″E | |
| Culbarting Rock | 31°24′29″S 117°1′39″E | |
| Cullinia Rocks | 32°0′19″S 123°10′59″E | |
| Cumberland Rock | 34°20′7″S 115°3′35″E | |
| Cumminin Rock | 32°4′52″S 118°14′10″E | |
| Curdy Curdy Rocks | 27°59′26″S 116°8′24″E | |
| Curnadinia Rock | 32°51′46″S 123°25′3″E | |
| Curringutting Rock | 32°11′24″S 118°29′57″E | |

== D ==
| Name | Coordinates | Remarks |
|---|---|---|
| Dajoing Rock | 30°26′32″S 118°3′58″E | |
| Dalgouring Rock | 30°25′5″S 117°59′46″E | |
| Dalrymple Rock | 34°16′44″S 122°25′34″E | |
| Damboring Rocks | 30°33′54″S 116°39′1″E | |
| Dampier Rock | 34°16′49″S 122°21′4″E | |
| Dandagin Rock | 32°41′53″S 118°26′33″E | |
| Dandy Rock | 30°6′42″S 116°10′43″E | |
| Dangemanning Rock | 31°36′52″S 117°49′46″E | |
| Danger Rocks | 16°51′37″S 122°3′5″E | |
| Daniels Rocks | 16°26′37″S 123°9′30″E | |
| Darkan Rock | 33°20′4″S 116°44′32″E | |
| Darrine Rock | 30°51′10″S 119°53′14″E | |
| Day Rock | 29°24′49″S 120°1′39″E | |
| Dead Horse Rocks | 29°21′56″S 121°16′37″E | |
| Debelin Rock | 32°50′53″S 117°20′2″E | |
| Declaration Rock | 17°55′15″S 122°8′36″E | |
| Dempster Rock | 32°46′59″S 119°28′29″E | |
| Depot Rocks | 31°9′21″S 121°24′55″E | |
| Derdibin Rock | 31°20′24″S 117°19′18″E | |
| Devils Rock | 33°55′49″S 121°53′5″E | |
| Devils Slide | 34°40′37″S 117°51′8″E | |
| Diamond Rock | 31°35′17″S 120°33′39″E | |
| Dice Rock | 14°11′56″S 125°39′26″E | |
| Dickie Rock | 16°23′4″S 123°4′42″E | |
| Dickman Rock | 33°2′33″S 119°16′37″E | |
| Dickson Rocks | 33°8′17″S 117°43′43″E | |
| Digger Rocks | 32°43′16″S 119°50′46″E | |
| Dingo Rock | 16°25′6″S 123°8′18″E | |
| Dingo Rock | 33°3′39″S 122°9′20″E | |
| Dingo Rock | 33°0′38″S 118°36′27″E | |
| Dingo Rock | 30°57′53″S 122°37′55″E | |
| Disappointment Rock | 32°7′53″S 120°55′30″E | |
| Disaster Rock | 18°3′48″S 122°4′28″E | |
| Dodd Rock | 33°55′36″S 122°35′52″E | |
| Dog Rock | 28°52′38″S 113°58′44″E | |
| Dog Rock | 32°58′6″S 121°3′48″E | |
| Dog Rock | 30°53′30″S 116°56′50″E | |
| Dog Rock | 35°1′9″S 117°53′3″E | |
| Dog Rocks | 25°54′56″S 118°15′35″E | |
| Dolphin Rock | 33°55′5″S 122°0′44″E | |
| Dome Rock | 28°24′53″S 114°48′17″E | |
| Doner Rock | 32°57′4″S 123°24′26″E | |
| Donkey Rocks | 29°50′50″S 121°43′16″E | |
| Doonding Rock | 29°53′7″S 116°2′56″E | |
| Dordie Rocks | 31°35′27″S 121°35′52″E | |
| Dragon Rocks | 32°48′52″S 119°1′52″E | |
| Drummond Rock | 29°56′44″S 114°58′20″E | |
| Duck Rock | 32°31′37″S 119°17′8″E | |
| Duck Rock | 31°59′20″S 115°32′27″E | |
| Duladgin Rock | 31°10′22″S 119°40′45″E | |
| Dulyalbin Rock | 31°34′30″S 118°58′58″E | |
| Dumpling Rocks | 35°0′23″S 117°27′16″E | |
| Dundas Rocks | 32°23′21″S 121°46′27″E | |
| Dunder, Rock | 35°1′47″S 118°9′26″E | |
| Dunn Rock | 33°20′17″S 119°29′10″E | |
| Dunn Rocks | 33°55′53″S 122°21′1″E | |
| Duranning Rock | 31°3′27″S 117°48′1″E | |
| Durdguding Rock | 31°26′45″S 118°17′27″E | |
| Durgacuttin Rock | 31°26′19″S 118°17′48″E | |
| Durgulyie Rock | 31°18′49″S 121°8′19″E | |
| Dutakajin Rocks | 30°4′14″S 117°22′22″E | |
| Dysons Rock | 33°28′26″S 117°42′22″E | |

== E ==
| Name | Coordinates | Remarks |
|---|---|---|
| Eagle Rock | 31°5′2″S 118°14′23″E | |
| East Rock | 20°39′29″S 116°41′48″E | |
| East Rock | 18°1′30″S 122°9′42″E | |
| Edah Rocks | 28°13′10″S 117°13′48″E | |
| Edith Rock | 34°12′9″S 114°59′49″E | |
| Eglinton Rocks | 31°37′30″S 115°39′13″E | See Alkimos, Western Australia |
| Elbow Rock | 32°6′5″S 115°43′38″E | |
| Eleanor Rocks | 32°2′43″S 115°43′34″E | |
| Elephant Rocks | 35°2′37″S 116°55′46″E | |
| Elephant Rock | 15°49′9″S 128°44′51″E | |
| Eliassen Rocks | 20°57′52″S 116°4′43″E | |
| Eliza Rocks | 25°53′19″S 127°33′51″E | |
| Ellison Rock | 32°48′49″S 121°2′3″E | |
| Elvire Rock | 29°30′10″S 119°35′57″E | |
| Empress Rock | 32°5′46″S 115°45′1″E | |
| Emu Rock | 32°27′26″S 119°24′3″E | |
| Emu Rocks | 30°51′15″S 123°9′42″E | |
| Emu Rocks | 30°27′47″S 115°1′51″E | |
| Emu Rocks | 31°21′44″S 121°31′24″E | |
| Emuming Rock | 31°5′26″S 116°56′23″E | |
| Entrance Rocks | 32°9′19″S 115°39′28″E | |
| Entrance Rocks | 32°3′11″S 115°43′21″E | |
| Epileptic Rock | 33°2′21″S 117°23′10″E | |
| Escape Rock | 34°5′29″S 122°15′39″E | |
| Escape Rocks | 17°59′46″S 122°9′32″E | |
| Essex Rocks | 30°21′22″S 114°59′41″E | |
| Evans Rocks | 16°27′7″S 123°7′51″E | |
| Eyre Rock | 14°30′3″S 125°5′21″E | |

== See also ==
- Geography of Western Australia
- Granite outcrops of Western Australia
- List of rocks in Western Australia, A-B, plus numerals
- List of rocks in Western Australia, F-K
- List of rocks in Western Australia, L-N
- List of rocks in Western Australia, O-S
- List of rocks in Western Australia, T-Z
- List of individual rocks
