= List of rocks in Western Australia (A–B) =

This list includes all gazetted rocks, boulders, pinnacles, crags, needles, pillars, rock formations, and tors in Western Australia, both inland and offshore. It does not include monoliths gazetted as mounts or hills, such as Mount Augustus.

The list is complete with respect to the 1996 Gazetteer of Australia. Dubious names have been checked against the online 2004 data, and in all cases confirmed correct. However, if any rocks have been gazetted or deleted since 1996, this list does not reflect these changes. Strictly speaking, Australian place names are gazetted in capital letters only; the names in this list have been converted to mixed case in accordance with normal capitalisation conventions. Locations are as gazetted; some large rock formations may extend over large areas.

See List of rocks in Western Australia for more.

== 0-9 ==
Name	Coordinates	Remarks
1 Mile Rocks	33°7′0″S 119°48′39″E	
10 Mile Rocks	31°27′47″S 121°19′0″E	
10 Mile Rocks	32°5′46″S 122°39′49″E	
14 Mile Rocks	31°1′38″S 121°22′17″E	
18 1/4 Mile Granite Rocks	29°37′55″S 119°0′5″E	
19 Feet Rock	32°1′26″S 115°35′49″E	
19 Mile Rocks	29°57′8″S 121°26′5″E	
22 Mile Rocks	29°57′10″S 121°27′54″E	
25 Mile Granite Rocks	29°37′3″S 118°54′41″E	
25 Mile Rocks	31°56′35″S 121°37′27″E	
25 Mile Rocks	29°56′44″S 121°28′54″E	
3 Mile Rock	32°27′58″S 121°37′12″E	
3 Mile Rocks	30°37′18″S 118°53′52″E	
50 Mile Rocks	31°51′49″S 121°37′50″E	
6 Mile Rock	31°14′45″S 116°56′21″E	
6 Mile Rocks	29°54′46″S 121°46′23″E	
71 Mile Rock	30°39′1″S 120°12′1″E	
8 Mile Rock	31°14′6″S 116°57′33″E	
9 Acre Rock	32°23′52″S 117°6′58″E	

== A ==
Name	Coordinates	Remarks
Abyssinia Rock	32°14′14″S 116°17′28″E	
Adam Rock	33°3′48″S 117°33′10″E	
Afghan Rock	27°7′49″S 117°43′9″E	
Afghan Rock	32°21′26″S 123°39′58″E	
Alert Rock	16°29′7″S 123°16′23″E	
Alice Rock	32°13′51″S 120°54′32″E	
Alligator Rock	15°12′6″S 128°8′42″E	
Amy Giles Rocks	25°53′32″S 128°31′13″E	
Amy Rocks	27°52′7″S 125°18′24″E	
Anderson Rocks	32°10′1″S 118°51′8″E	
Ant Rock	32°12′32″S 120°38′1″E	
Anvil Rock (Western Australia)	35°1′29″S 117°21′46″E	
Ardagh Rocks	27°52′35″S 123°18′45″E	
Armstrong Rock	31°59′27″S 115°30′1″E	
Awong Rock	16°31′15″S 123°0′27″E	

== B ==
Name	Coordinates	Remarks
Baanga Rock	33°12′27″S 119°56′36″E	
Badgarning Rocks	33°18′47″S 117°16′42″E	
Badjerin Rock	30°46′31″S 117°20′14″E	
Bail Rock	33°51′35″S 121°59′23″E	
Baladjie Rock	30°57′21″S 118°52′29″E	
Balancing Rock	29°20′37″S 121°31′39″E	
Balarky Rock	29°35′3″S 121°16′35″E	
Bald Rock	27°17′9″S 117°31′54″E	
Bald Rock	31°35′56″S 116°55′29″E	
Bald Rock	33°20′17″S 121°22′37″E	
Bald Rock	28°24′48″S 114°48′28″E	
Ball Rock	16°21′0″S 122°55′29″E	
Balla Rock	26°54′22″S 116°1′31″E	
Balladonia Rock	32°27′42″S 123°51′41″E	
Ballaging Rock	33°20′59″S 117°34′59″E	
Ballan Rock	28°10′55″S 117°25′24″E	
Banawar Rock	29°37′27″S 116°51′44″E	
Bandicoot Bar	15°47′31″S 128°41′39″E	
Banduppin Rock	31°59′14″S 117°41′19″E	
Bandy Rock	29°9′19″S 119°48′5″E	
Bangemall Rocks	28°7′53″S 115°34′10″E	
Banks Rock	32°6′7″S 120°45′29″E	
Barbalin Rock	30°58′7″S 118°5′45″E	
Bare Rock	33°19′27″S 117°41′22″E	
Bare Rock	27°57′50″S 116°54′22″E	
Bare Rock	20°33′5″S 116°26′27″E	
Barge Rock	28°27′2″S 113°43′17″E	
Barine Rock	31°22′19″S 117°30′54″E	
Barlangi Rock	27°10′53″S 118°49′56″E	
Barnard Rocks	26°5′30″S 128°15′9″E	
Baropin Rocks	30°31′59″S 118°29′26″E	
Barrett Rock	16°3′46″S 123°19′42″E	
Battlement Rocks	20°6′12″S 123°17′12″E	
Bay Rock	33°55′31″S 122°35′16″E	
Bayliss Rock	33°54′3″S 121°37′41″E	
Baynes Rock	34°2′57″S 121°21′16″E	
Beagle Reefs	34°1′11″S 121°58′35″E	
Beagle Rocks	32°3′38″S 115°43′35″E	
Beanthiny Rocks	29°34′49″S 117°15′9″E	
Bearing Rock	33°59′14″S 123°5′49″E	
Beck Rocks	15°17′41″S 128°4′34″E	
Beetle Rock	34°17′28″S 118°19′21″E	
Beetle Rock	30°28′43″S 120°33′26″E	
Bejowera Rocks	29°59′28″S 117°27′7″E	
Bell Rock (Western Australia)	26°7′22″S 128°35′37″E	
Benderine Rock	31°31′53″S 117°38′53″E	
Bentenalling Rock	31°34′43″S 116°50′14″E	
Beringbooding Rock	30°33′35″S 118°29′38″E	
Bezout Rock	20°33′7″S 117°11′2″E	
Bibiking Rock	33°28′26″S 117°42′59″E	
Biddles Rock	14°18′10″S 125°23′25″E	
Bilga Rock	26°57′18″S 115°56′27″E	
Biljahnie Rock	31°19′4″S 119°51′39″E	
Billaderrin Rock	32°5′22″S 118°17′56″E	
Billiburning Rock	30°10′20″S 117°54′37″E	
Bilya Rock	29°0′23″S 115°51′25″E	
Binaronca Rock	31°42′33″S 121°41′31″E	
Binghi Rocks	13°54′43″S 126°32′14″E	
Binjarrabin Rock	31°19′15″S 118°29′56″E	
Binti Binti Rocks	30°12′46″S 121°55′46″E	
Binyarinyinna Rock	31°33′37″S 122°5′21″E	
Bird Rock	34°54′26″S 118°29′2″E	
Bird Rock	33°35′48″S 115°6′14″E	
Bird Rock	28°11′24″S 114°14′10″E	
Bird Rocks	16°29′5″S 123°0′2″E	
Bird Rocks	34°59′12″S 117°25′57″E	
Birdwhistle Rock	32°53′29″S 117°28′4″E	
Bishop Rock	34°8′27″S 121°55′23″E	
Bishop Rocks	13°44′21″S 126°6′53″E	
Bittern Rock	18°0′38″S 122°12′18″E	
Bittleyong Rocks	32°34′19″S 117°0′2″E	
Bivouac Rocks	33°59′46″S 119°16′42″E	
Black Gin Rocks	29°42′10″S 121°42′42″E	
Black Rock	20°33′45″S 115°33′24″E	
Black Rock	20°36′58″S 117°42′21″E	
Black Rock	34°6′0″S 120°27′59″E	
Black Rock	28°11′46″S 114°14′42″E	
Black Rock	34°14′7″S 115°0′10″E	
Black Rock	22°45′38″S 113°38′44″E	
Black Rock	16°4′47″S 123°34′42″E	
Black Rock	34°2′47″S 122°12′20″E	
Black Rock	34°59′31″S 118°7′45″E	
Black Rock	18°33′24″S 127°17′3″E	
Black Rocks	26°6′24″S 113°10′16″E	
Black Rocks	15°2′47″S 124°25′23″E	
Black Rocks	18°34′10″S 121°44′18″E	
Black Rocks	19°53′21″S 126°48′44″E	
Black Rocks	17°5′19″S 123°35′6″E	
The Black Rocks	18°21′34″S 126°5′41″E	
Black Rod Rock	16°34′10″S 122°46′22″E	
Blackboy Rocks	27°53′8″S 123°14′58″E	
Blackmans Rock	28°26′17″S 114°47′57″E	
Blind Rocks	34°4′44″S 123°11′39″E	
Blue Rock	32°19′44″S 116°7′0″E	
Boat Rock	30°19′43″S 114°59′31″E	
Boat Rock	20°39′24″S 116°42′5″E	
Boiler Rock	20°34′56″S 116°40′55″E	
Boingaring Rocks	32°27′20″S 123°12′45″E	
Booanya Rock	32°45′42″S 123°36′22″E	
Boodarding Rock	31°35′58″S 119°48′53″E	
Boogoordar Rocks	29°53′12″S 117°8′57″E	
Boojerbeenyer Rock	32°20′31″S 121°50′29″E	
Booker Rocks	30°25′4″S 115°1′25″E	
Boonjading Rock	31°28′15″S 116°49′14″E	
Boorabbin Rock	31°12′13″S 120°17′8″E	
Booragiming Rock	32°28′43″S 116°48′54″E	
Boordabbie Rock	31°39′14″S 117°9′20″E	
Bora Rocks	30°8′54″S 120°55′51″E	
Borayukkin Rock	31°55′31″S 118°46′35″E	
Borrikin Rock	30°31′8″S 117°4′32″E	
Bottle Rock	32°43′50″S 119°7′54″E	
Boulder Rock	33°43′16″S 124°9′45″E	
Boundary Rock	33°55′23″S 119°0′54″E	
Bowles Rock	16°3′1″S 123°25′16″E	
Boyagin Rock	32°28′19″S 116°52′44″E	
Boyd Rock	35°2′35″S 116°55′54″E	
Boywurup Rock	34°4′42″S 116°51′41″E	
Bramble Rock	35°2′36″S 117°54′41″E	
Bream Rocks	34°59′58″S 117°28′7″E	
Breeborinia Rock	33°5′57″S 123°19′35″E	
Briggs Rocks	26°16′2″S 113°28′49″E	
Bringabinya Rock	33°5′34″S 123°23′19″E	
Brittain Rock	34°44′1″S 116°28′37″E	
Brittons Rock	34°44′1″S 116°28′37″E	
Bronc Rock	29°49′8″S 121°32′59″E	
The Brothers	32°9′27″S 115°40′7″E	
Bruce Rock	31°52′3″S 118°10′0″E	
Bubbowroo Rock	27°9′42″S 117°29′54″E	
Buccaneer Rock	17°57′50″S 122°14′42″E	
Bugin Rock	32°5′13″S 117°22′58″E	
Buldania Rocks	32°4′43″S 122°2′8″E	
Bulgin Rock	31°39′33″S 117°4′51″E	
Bull Rocks	32°35′39″S 121°6′12″E	
Bullamania Rock	29°10′4″S 117°39′41″E	
Bullara Rock	14°8′20″S 125°39′4″E	
Bullarragin Rock	31°18′22″S 118°35′56″E	
Bullock Rock	31°37′41″S 117°13′35″E	
Bulyairdie Rock	30°35′1″S 122°24′30″E	
Bunbury Rock	34°2′29″S 122°2′53″E	
Bunjinbar Rocks	30°42′43″S 116°13′29″E	
Bunketch Rocks	30°26′48″S 117°3′6″E	
Bunmunning Rock	32°39′59″S 117°39′8″E	
Buntine Rock	29°58′3″S 116°35′10″E	
Burkett Rock	33°3′30″S 119°49′10″E	
Burns Rocks	31°43′43″S 115°42′10″E	
Burra Rock	31°23′24″S 121°11′45″E	
Burracobbing Rock	31°15′10″S 118°0′13″E	
Burragattin Rock	31°25′11″S 118°20′6″E	
Burruckgnuling Rock	32°43′16″S 117°32′34″E	
Burton Rocks	33°54′40″S 121°48′58″E	
Bushfire Rock	32°26′34″S 119°20′54″E	
Byeang Rock	29°0′39″S 119°49′46″E	

== See also ==
- Geography of Western Australia
- Granite outcrops of Western Australia
- List of rocks in Western Australia, C-E
- List of rocks in Western Australia, F-K
- List of rocks in Western Australia, L-N
- List of rocks in Western Australia, O-S
- List of rocks in Western Australia, T-Z
- List of individual rocks
