= List of rocks in Western Australia (L–N) =

This list includes all gazetted rocks, boulders, pinnacles, crags, needles, pillars, rock formations, and tors in Western Australia, both inland and offshore. It does not include monoliths gazetted as mounts or hills, such as Mount Augustus.

The list is complete with respect to the 1996 Gazetteer of Australia. Dubious names have been checked against the online 2004 data, and in all cases confirmed correct. However, if any rocks have been gazetted or deleted since 1996, this list does not reflect these changes. Strictly speaking, Australian place names are gazetted in capital letters only; the names in this list have been converted to mixed case in accordance with normal capitalisation conventions. Locations are as gazetted; some large rock formations may extend over large areas.

See List of rocks in Western Australia for more.

== L ==
| Name | Coordinates | Remarks |
|---|---|---|
| La Perouse Rock | 34°18′29″S 122°17′29″E | |
| Lackman Rock | 32°34′53″S 121°5′50″E | |
| Lakeside Rock | 32°35′21″S 119°22′41″E | |
| Lang Rock | 27°58′41″S 123°25′3″E | |
| Latham Rock | 29°46′11″S 116°24′32″E | |
| Lee Rock | 14°3′3″S 125°46′45″E | |
| Lemon Rock | 29°35′52″S 120°10′33″E | |
| Levi Rock | 32°49′16″S 117°34′37″E | |
| Lightning Rock | 26°4′3″S 127°45′14″E | |
| Lilford Rock | 35°2′51″S 116°55′52″E | |
| Lilian Addicott Rock | 28°42′37″S 123°36′39″E | |
| Lilian Stokes Rock | 33°4′3″S 120°5′37″E | |
| Lily Mccarthy Rock | 32°40′55″S 119°20′26″E | |
| Limpet Rock | 33°52′39″S 121°58′9″E | |
| Little Bald Rock | 31°34′13″S 116°55′52″E | |
| Little Devil | 33°55′46″S 121°53′7″E | |
| Little Puntaping Rock | 33°20′1″S 117°24′23″E | |
| Little River Rocks | 34°59′58″S 117°20′7″E | |
| Lock Rock | 33°58′43″S 122°1′23″E | |
| Lomos Rock | 32°23′2″S 117°35′22″E | |
| Lone Rock | 16°26′48″S 123°9′49″E | |
| Lonely Rock | 33°48′55″S 124°10′19″E | |
| Lookout Rocks | 21°56′59″S 121°23′44″E | |
| Lookout Rocks | 35°1′55″S 117°53′55″E | |
| Lory Rock | 14°45′11″S 128°13′36″E | |
| Low Rock | 33°51′17″S 121°57′44″E | |
| Low Rock | 24°56′8″S 113°9′0″E | |
| Low Rock | 15°1′35″S 124°53′1″E | |
| Low Rocks | 14°3′50″S 125°52′23″E | |
| Lucy Rock | 32°39′25″S 119°22′10″E | |
| The Lumps | 31°47′39″S 115°42′54″E | |

== M ==
| Name | Coordinates | Remarks |
|---|---|---|
| Macdonald Rock | 16°31′57″S 123°0′32″E | |
| Maddens Rock | 32°7′4″S 115°38′58″E | |
| Madmans Rock | 27°46′29″S 114°7′18″E | |
| Magistrate Rocks | 33°55′45″S 121°58′5″E | |
| Malgar Rock | 29°14′33″S 118°53′57″E | |
| Mallee Hen Rocks | 28°57′53″S 123°22′9″E | |
| Malyalling Rock | 32°42′57″S 117°36′28″E | |
| The Man In The Boat | 20°48′41″S 116°4′37″E | |
| Marble Bar | 21°11′15″S 119°42′35″E | |
| Marble Rocks | 32°31′3″S 119°24′10″E | |
| Mardarbilla Rock | 32°51′48″S 123°50′57″E | |
| Mardie Rock | 21°0′9″S 116°0′27″E | |
| Marmabup Rock | 34°40′30″S 117°50′54″E | |
| Mart Rock | 34°2′49″S 122°39′9″E | |
| Matthew Rock | 34°11′49″S 122°59′29″E | |
| Mavis Rock | 30°26′56″S 123°8′6″E | |
| May Rock | 20°47′39″S 116°31′26″E | |
| Mccann Rock | 32°32′57″S 118°36′15″E | |
| Mcdermid Rock | 32°1′20″S 120°44′1″E | |
| Mcgeary Rock | 35°1′58″S 117°19′58″E | |
| Mcleod Rock | 29°1′31″S 119°35′22″E | |
| Mcmillan Rocks | 28°8′5″S 122°46′3″E | |
| Mcpherson Rock | 32°27′9″S 121°40′20″E | |
| Mcpherson Rock | 32°17′9″S 123°50′46″E | |
| Mcvilly Rock | 16°38′21″S 122°43′56″E | |
| Median Rock | 33°50′41″S 122°0′47″E | |
| Meeragoring Rock | 27°21′38″S 117°27′31″E | |
| Mekatanna Rock | 27°18′44″S 117°31′54″E | |
| Menangina Rocks | 29°50′21″S 121°56′15″E | |
| Menmuir Rock | 16°22′14″S 123°15′13″E | |
| Meroin Rock | 29°11′32″S 118°8′0″E | |
| Meroonga Rock | 27°33′14″S 115°51′51″E | |
| Mess Rock | 34°30′39″S 122°1′15″E | |
| Metchering Rock | 31°39′12″S 118°0′6″E | |
| Mewstone | 32°5′11″S 115°39′25″E | |
| Mi Mi Rocks | 27°27′30″S 124°22′26″E | |
| Miawuryguna Rocks | 19°59′11″S 119°22′43″E | |
| Mid Rock | 16°21′56″S 123°12′34″E | |
| Middle Rock | 13°58′3″S 126°20′35″E | |
| Middle Rock | 34°11′58″S 115°1′31″E | |
| Middle Rock | 24°59′30″S 113°7′4″E | |
| Middle Rock | 33°57′39″S 120°7′24″E | |
| Middle Rock | 34°18′27″S 121°50′56″E | |
| Middle Rock | 35°1′56″S 118°1′42″E | |
| Milgannine Rock | 31°32′13″S 117°42′38″E | |
| Miller Rocks | 20°26′27″S 116°38′24″E | |
| Milliwarry Rock | 27°8′19″S 117°39′59″E | |
| Milne Rock | 27°11′25″S 127°13′40″E | |
| Milutha Rock | 28°0′20″S 116°47′2″E | |
| Mindjuring Rock | 30°47′4″S 120°25′22″E | |
| Minegardar Rocks | 28°5′7″S 117°31′4″E | |
| Minetagin Rock | 30°31′7″S 120°31′45″E | |
| Mitchell Rocks | 29°2′40″S 120°16′56″E | |
| Moby Dick | 34°7′59″S 121°46′14″E | |
| Modesty Rock | 32°32′5″S 119°23′40″E | |
| Moir Rock | 32°39′7″S 121°25′4″E | |
| Mollerin Rock | 30°32′9″S 117°33′56″E | |
| Molloocutty Rock | 31°59′18″S 118°51′30″E | |
| Moltthomy Rock | 31°45′2″S 119°7′31″E | |
| Monday Rock | 31°59′18″S 115°32′18″E | |
| Mondie Rocks | 29°22′58″S 119°10′10″E | |
| Mongebin Rocks | 32°33′30″S 117°3′24″E | |
| Monkey Rock | 26°8′40″S 113°9′58″E | |
| Monkey Rock | 33°59′6″S 119°2′37″E | |
| Monument Rock | 28°37′22″S 121°52′3″E | |
| Moochabinna Rock | 31°44′28″S 122°20′22″E | |
| Moogoorlar Rocks | 29°55′23″S 117°2′47″E | |
| Moolyall Rocks | 33°25′30″S 120°4′16″E | |
| Moon Rock | 29°26′17″S 122°45′41″E | |
| Moon Rock | 14°24′59″S 125°58′8″E | |
| Moonargidding Rock | 31°27′43″S 119°22′3″E | |
| Moonta Rock | 22°25′25″S 113°43′7″E | |
| Mooranoppin Rock | 31°35′18″S 117°45′14″E | |
| Moordamulling Rock | 30°37′13″S 118°26′38″E | |
| Moorine Rocks | 31°13′44″S 118°58′32″E | |
| Moran Rock | 26°39′0″S 117°40′44″E | |
| Moresby Rock | 16°8′18″S 123°54′58″E | |
| Morlining Rock | 31°15′35″S 119°47′20″E | |
| Moses Rock | 33°45′26″S 114°59′40″E | |
| Mount Pleasant Rock | 35°2′13″S 118°2′6″E | |
| Muckenbooding Rock | 30°55′22″S 118°11′52″E | |
| Mudurup Rocks | 31°59′53″S 115°44′47″E | |
| Muggamuggin Rocks | 31°27′51″S 116°38′15″E | |
| Muggerugging Rock | 33°8′3″S 117°31′26″E | |
| Muirillup Rock | 34°39′31″S 116°14′48″E | |
| Mulline Rock | 29°44′26″S 120°27′46″E | |
| Mungan Gabby Rock | 30°44′3″S 117°45′11″E | |
| Munkinwobert Rock | 33°23′28″S 120°17′6″E | |
| Murray Rock | 33°59′41″S 122°4′33″E | |
| Murray Rock | 32°19′4″S 119°17′0″E | |
| Murrungnulg Rock North | 29°26′59″S 116°43′46″E | |
| Murrungnulg Rocks South | 29°37′59″S 116°43′37″E | |
| Murtadinia Rock | 33°1′6″S 123°37′42″E | |
| Mushroom Rock | 34°13′10″S 115°1′24″E | |
| Mushroom Rock | 31°59′34″S 115°32′27″E | |
| Mushroom Rock | 20°24′18″S 115°32′32″E | |
| Mushroom Rock | 27°45′11″S 114°8′5″E | |
| Mushroom Rock | 14°8′51″S 125°45′49″E | |
| Mushroom Rock | 32°16′0″S 115°40′56″E | |
| Mushroom Rock | 24°45′13″S 113°9′28″E | |
| Myuna Rock | 33°15′16″S 119°53′40″E | |

== N ==
| Name | Coordinates | Remarks |
|---|---|---|
| Nab Rock | 17°59′23″S 122°10′37″E | |
| Nairibin Rock | 33°20′17″S 117°54′58″E | |
| Nakerdar Rock | 28°33′58″S 117°32′51″E | |
| Nalarine Rock | 31°15′32″S 120°31′1″E | |
| Nalyaring Rock | 31°28′48″S 117°41′17″E | |
| Namerlonia Rock | 33°14′47″S 123°16′55″E | |
| Nanambinia Rock | 32°40′21″S 123°34′43″E | |
| Nandanarr Rocks | 18°40′11″S 121°45′20″E | |
| Napping Rock | 32°39′41″S 116°57′15″E | |
| Nares Rock | 21°25′52″S 115°16′57″E | |
| Nargalgerri Rock | 31°12′58″S 120°51′14″E | |
| Nargalyerin Rock | 31°27′37″S 119°1′55″E | |
| Native Rocks | 32°17′57″S 119°32′54″E | |
| Natural Bridge | 27°49′42″S 114°6′30″E | |
| Natural Bridge | 35°7′11″S 117°53′19″E | |
| Needle Eye Rocks | 18°14′36″S 125°53′45″E | |
| Needle Rock | 15°28′31″S 124°29′31″E | |
| The Needles | 14°47′39″S 128°24′49″E | |
| Neendojer Rocks | 31°54′27″S 119°7′8″E | |
| Nelson Rocks | 20°26′58″S 116°40′18″E | |
| Neuabirina Rock | 30°47′34″S 116°32′15″E | |
| New Year Rock | 33°51′11″S 124°7′10″E | |
| Newman Rock | 32°7′2″S 123°10′9″E | |
| Niblock Rocks | 15°48′47″S 123°59′24″E | |
| Nierguine Rock | 30°24′28″S 118°50′15″E | |
| Nimberrin Rock | 31°31′15″S 117°56′9″E | |
| Nockine Rock | 32°1′7″S 116°20′18″E | |
| Nokaning Rock | 31°19′47″S 118°4′24″E | |
| Nongerin Rocks | 32°8′8″S 118°14′53″E | |
| Nonjigull Rock | 32°3′28″S 118°11′10″E | |
| Noombenberry Rock | 31°41′17″S 118°47′20″E | |
| Noondoonia Rocks | 32°11′20″S 123°46′11″E | |
| Noonebin Rock | 32°35′7″S 117°14′37″E | |
| Noonie Rock | 28°31′34″S 115°33′12″E | |
| Nora Mccarthy Rock | 32°37′56″S 119°20′13″E | |
| North Breaker | 15°29′57″S 123°24′54″E | |
| North Lump | 31°47′20″S 115°42′47″E | |
| North Rock | 31°57′33″S 115°43′6″E | |
| North Rock | 14°12′22″S 126°2′46″E | |
| North Rock | 28°11′6″S 114°13′37″E | |
| North Rock | 17°59′32″S 122°8′28″E | |
| North Rock | 35°6′59″S 117°51′8″E | |
| North Rocks | 32°17′10″S 123°49′20″E | |
| North Ronsard Rocks | 30°28′45″S 115°2′47″E | |
| Northonopine Rock | 31°42′41″S 119°26′33″E | |
| Northumberland Rock | 35°6′40″S 118°0′57″E | |
| Northwest Rock | 35°10′43″S 117°51′22″E | |
| Nukarni Rocks | 31°18′31″S 118°7′45″E | |
| Nungarin Rock | 31°9′16″S 118°6′50″E | |
| Nurdungarra Rock | 31°18′21″S 119°6′57″E | |

== See also ==
- Geography of Western Australia
- Granite outcrops of Western Australia
- List of rocks in Western Australia, A-B, plus numerals
- List of rocks in Western Australia, C-E
- List of rocks in Western Australia, F-K
- List of rocks in Western Australia, O-S
- List of rocks in Western Australia, T-Z
