= List of rocks in Western Australia (T–Z) =

This list includes all gazetted rocks, boulders, pinnacles, crags, needles, pillars, rock formations, and tors in Western Australia, both inland and offshore. It does not include monoliths gazetted as mounts or hills, such as Mount Augustus. It is complete with respect to the 1996 Gazetteer of Australia. Dubious names have been checked against the online 2004 data, and in all cases confirmed correct. However, if any rocks have been gazetted or deleted since 1996, this list does not reflect such changes. Strictly speaking, Australian place names are gazetted in capital letters only; the names in this list have been converted to mixed case in accordance with normal capitalisation conventions. Locations are as gazetted; some large rock formations may extend over large areas.

See List of rocks in Western Australia for more.

== T ==
Name	Coordinates	Remarks
Table Rock	20°35′29″S 117°45′10″E	
Tabling Rocks	32°55′30″S 117°11′18″E	
Tagon Rock	33°54′15″S 122°59′29″E	
Talbot Rock	32°26′39″S 117°46′7″E	
Talboys Rock	17°18′14″S 122°1′46″E	
Tamacurring Rock	33°7′36″S 117°42′0″E	
Tammarin Rock	31°17′50″S 118°21′28″E	
Tammi Rocks	30°16′47″S 118°1′38″E	
Tammin Rock	31°40′14″S 117°31′5″E	
Tandegin Rock	31°36′48″S 118°24′50″E	
Tarbunkenup Rocks	33°57′5″S 118°28′17″E	
Tarin Rock	33°5′28″S 118°13′10″E	
Taylor Rock	33°54′56″S 121°51′41″E	
Taylor Rock	32°14′53″S 120°56′37″E	
Thabilinya Rock	32°17′28″S 123°44′58″E	
Theatre Rock	32°8′30″S 121°33′16″E	
Thiel Rock	32°11′18″S 120°53′38″E	
Third Rocks	32°19′23″S 115°41′25″E	
Thistle Rock	33°58′43″S 122°2′57″E	
Thring Rock	22°34′29″S 123°54′57″E	
Thursday Rock	31°31′54″S 120°38′6″E	
Thyssen Rock	35°3′27″S 116°39′30″E	
Tide Gauge Rock	33°55′11″S 120°33′22″E	
Time Rock	33°57′42″S 122°1′59″E	
Toapin Rock	31°58′47″S 117°21′15″E	
Tom Rock	29°39′50″S 120°11′44″E	
Tombstone Rocks	31°13′35″S 116°51′36″E	
Toms Rock	29°12′45″S 118°43′5″E	
Tooklejenna Rock	33°40′43″S 123°42′42″E	
Toonarrie Rock	31°21′55″S 121°6′52″E	
Tooth Rocks	14°39′5″S 125°1′53″E	
Torpedo Rock	33°38′51″S 115°1′5″E	
Totadgin Rock	31°34′28″S 118°12′41″E	
Towndrow Rock	16°38′21″S 123°28′54″E	
Trainers Rocks	29°7′56″S 119°1′51″E	
Transit Rocks	31°59′31″S 115°33′14″E	
Trig Rock	14°28′31″S 125°0′26″E	
Trigg Lump	28°58′37″S 113°57′46″E	
Tringa Rock	20°39′45″S 115°27′35″E	
Trinity Rock	34°19′14″S 121°37′36″E	
Triple Rock	34°2′35″S 121°37′11″E	
Tryal Rocks	20°16′34″S 115°23′7″E	
Tua Rock	29°36′21″S 116°46′21″E	
Tuesday Rock	33°54′14″S 121°50′17″E	
Turturdine Rock	30°25′19″S 120°28′37″E	
Twin Rocks	34°22′3″S 122°12′52″E	
Twin Rocks	32°0′39″S 115°33′25″E	
Twin Rocks	21°33′39″S 119°36′55″E	
Two Sisters	35°3′42″S 117°56′53″E	

== U ==
Name	Coordinates	Remarks
Uberin Rock	31°0′11″S 116°58′43″E	
Ucarty Rock	31°20′45″S 116°58′58″E	
Udallin Rock	32°4′10″S 118°10′40″E	
Ularring Rock	29°55′32″S 120°32′50″E	
Ularring Rock	31°29′48″S 116°51′57″E	
Ulogunna Rock	27°34′1″S 117°13′32″E	
Uralla Rock	33°11′36″S 119°51′20″E	
Uraryie Rock	31°11′10″S 123°25′6″E	
Urawa Rocks	28°14′10″S 115°32′21″E	

== V ==
Name	Coordinates	Remarks
Vancouver Rock	35°8′33″S 117°59′15″E	
Vans Rock	15°4′9″S 128°6′3″E	
Varley Rock	32°37′48″S 119°21′50″E	
Victoria Rock	20°42′58″S 116°23′23″E	
Victoria Rock	31°17′40″S 120°55′33″E	
Villaret Rock	30°28′44″S 115°3′24″E	
Vinegar Rock	32°23′35″S 117°39′20″E	

== W ==
Name	Coordinates	Remarks
Wadabuna Rock	31°37′3″S 123°44′38″E	
Wadarrah Rocks	27°50′32″S 121°19′26″E	
Waddoin Rock	30°34′2″S 118°35′51″E	
Wadduwarra Rocks	28°3′54″S 117°34′47″E	
Walga Rock	27°24′S 117°27′E	
Walganna Rock	27°24′4″S 117°27′54″E	
Walker Rock	16°52′15″S 121°48′30″E	
Wallaby Rocks	27°48′35″S 125°48′58″E	
Wallangering Rock	30°48′48″S 120°5′36″E	
Wallaroo Rock	30°48′7″S 120°29′28″E	
Walling Rock	29°27′26″S 120°21′40″E	
Walloo Rock	27°14′52″S 117°25′33″E	
Walogerina Rock	31°54′49″S 122°24′20″E	
Walsh Rock	29°49′10″S 122°22′14″E	
Walyahmoning Rock	30°38′1″S 118°44′58″E	
Walyurin Rocks	32°57′21″S 118°2′53″E	
Wanarra Rock	29°31′23″S 116°47′36″E	
Wandaning Rock	30°36′47″S 118°20′11″E	
Wandina Rock	30°21′35″S 116°5′19″E	
Wangea Rocks	28°57′33″S 116°35′21″E	
Wargangering Rock	31°11′18″S 120°30′49″E	
Warn Rock	13°8′59″S 126°5′59″E	
Warrachuppin Rock	31°1′2″S 118°41′48″E	
Warratarra Rock	28°17′47″S 118°6′33″E	
Washington Rocks	30°9′7″S 117°34′36″E	
Waterbidden Rock	31°55′59″S 118°56′0″E	
Waterwitch Rocks	34°19′20″S 121°40′38″E	
Wattle Rocks	32°15′48″S 119°34′53″E	
Wave Rock Formation	32°26′39″S 118°53′34″E	
Way Rock	16°24′17″S 123°23′55″E	
Weberine Rock	31°40′53″S 116°58′58″E	
Wedge Rock	24°47′49″S 113°10′3″E	
Wellstead Rock	32°35′45″S 120°51′40″E	
Weowanie Rock	31°7′54″S 119°45′9″E	
West Rock	14°19′39″S 125°55′20″E	
West Rock	32°7′17″S 115°39′22″E	
Whale Head Rock	35°2′6″S 117°55′12″E	
Whale Rock	33°57′58″S 120°6′53″E	
Whale Rock	34°1′35″S 121°39′10″E	
Whale Rock	17°57′42″S 122°10′34″E	
Whale Rock	20°27′13″S 115°36′17″E	
Whalesback	34°13′44″S 115°0′19″E	
Wheeler Rock	32°20′9″S 119°16′58″E	
Whinbin Rock	33°5′39″S 117°21′35″E	
Whistling Rock	24°19′39″S 113°24′6″E	
Whistling Rock	34°0′14″S 122°12′39″E	
White Man Rock	31°2′43″S 117°51′25″E	
White Rock	32°16′34″S 115°41′22″E	
White Rock	34°58′51″S 117°24′14″E	
White Rocks	18°12′4″S 124°46′14″E	
White Rocks	22°55′53″S 115°42′25″E	
Wickebin Rock	33°7′30″S 117°39′53″E	
Winburn Rocks	26°3′6″S 127°30′40″E	
Windjamoora Rock	18°4′29″S 125°12′18″E	
Winjee Sam Rock	33°40′4″S 114°59′32″E	
Winnecke Rock	23°13′29″S 124°0′16″E	
Winterbottom Rocks	27°54′42″S 125°11′36″E	
Wittamuning Rock	31°3′6″S 117°59′24″E	
Wolf Rock	14°14′13″S 125°22′13″E	
Womarbinya Rock	33°7′8″S 123°21′47″E	
Wonberna Granite Rock	32°36′30″S 123°45′46″E	
Woodhouse Rocks	16°43′20″S 122°41′34″E	
Woolgarong Rocks	29°39′23″S 117°28′43″E	
Woolgerong Rock	27°23′42″S 117°23′9″E	
Woondelin Rock	32°9′1″S 118°7′56″E	
Woondlin Rock	32°33′44″S 118°3′21″E	
Woorkakanin Rock	32°29′11″S 118°18′16″E	
Wornanya Rock	32°17′12″S 123°51′10″E	
Wreck Rock	31°48′15″S 115°42′58″E	
Wurrah Rock	27°23′0″S 117°21′31″E	
Wyadup Rocks	33°40′53″S 114°59′20″E	

== Y ==
Name	Coordinates	Remarks
Yallabeerangoo Rock	28°52′52″S 117°53′8″E	
Yalodinya Rock	32°50′0″S 123°26′4″E	
Yandangoobin Rock	31°3′10″S 119°30′19″E	
Yanoning Rock	30°35′33″S 118°30′26″E	
Yardina Rock	31°41′15″S 122°13′27″E	
Yardoo Rock	27°26′36″S 117°7′5″E	
Yarmany Rock	30°40′35″S 120°43′34″E	
Yarralmungup Rocks	31°49′1″S 115°43′28″E	
Yeagumbinya Rock	33°3′25″S 123°17′49″E	
Yeanilling Rock	32°34′41″S 117°12′32″E	
Yeedabirrup Rock	33°47′9″S 117°16′19″E	
Yeerakine Rock	32°33′43″S 118°19′2″E	
Yellow Rock	30°56′40″S 116°59′55″E	
Yendang Rock	29°18′44″S 120°18′7″E	
Yerdanie Rock	31°11′6″S 120°37′37″E	
Yilgerin Rock	32°0′47″S 118°9′4″E	
Yilliminning Rock	32°56′42″S 117°22′17″E	
Yindi Rock	30°35′3″S 122°29′24″E	
Yittunging Rock	31°8′52″S 116°51′36″E	
Yodgabin Rock	33°10′6″S 117°38′4″E	
York Rock	34°3′19″S 122°35′34″E	
Youering Rock	31°32′32″S 117°22′10″E	
Yowie Rock	29°59′4″S 120°12′49″E	
Yundhajibbie Rocks	28°3′37″S 122°38′0″E	

== See also ==
- Geography of Western Australia
- Granite outcrops of Western Australia
- List of rocks in Western Australia, A-B, plus numerals
- List of rocks in Western Australia, C-E
- List of rocks in Western Australia, F-K
- List of rocks in Western Australia, L-N
- List of rocks in Western Australia, O-S
