= List of rocks in Western Australia (O–S) =

This list includes all gazetted rocks, boulders, pinnacles, crags, needles, pillars, rock formations, and tors in Western Australia, both inland and offshore. It does not include monoliths gazetted as mounts or hills, such as Mount Augustus. It is complete with respect to the 1996 Gazetteer of Australia. Dubious names have been checked against the online 2004 data, and in all cases confirmed correct. However, if any rocks have been gazetted or deleted since 1996, this list does not reflect these changes. Strictly speaking, Australian place names are gazetted in capital letters only; the names in this list have been converted to mixed case in accordance with normal capitalisation conventions. Locations are as gazetted; some large rock formations may extend over large areas.

See List of rocks in Western Australia for more.

== O ==
Name	Coordinates	Remarks
O'Loughlin Rock	29°37′40″S 121°22′11″E	
Oakey Rock	23°59′12″S 115°57′31″E	
Olby Rock	29°57′10″S 119°26′12″E	
Old Cow Rock	28°29′53″S 114°46′48″E	
Old Man Rock	34°12′59″S 115°0′14″E	
Olga Rocks	31°42′41″S 119°34′58″E	
Oliver Rock	13°58′20″S 125°33′25″E	
One Tree Rock	33°13′14″S 119°52′46″E	
Ongerup Rock	33°54′28″S 118°22′53″E	
Orange Rock	21°0′37″S 118°3′1″E	
Orton Rock	30°2′6″S 114°57′9″E	
Outer 7 Foot Rock	30°35′18″S 115°3′3″E	
Outer Rock	18°41′41″S 121°41′54″E	
Outer Rocks	30°26′30″S 114°59′42″E	
Overhanging Rock	20°38′55″S 115°30′8″E	
Oyster Rock	14°5′38″S 126°41′13″E	
Oyster Rock	14°4′19″S 125°46′11″E	
Oyster Rock	20°40′23″S 115°27′11″E	
Oyster Stacks	22°7′45″S 113°52′34″E	

== P ==
Name	Coordinates	Remarks
Painted Rocks (Western Australia)	18°14′46″S 126°13′0″E	
Pallarup Rocks	33°15′18″S 119°45′17″E	
Palyarra Rock	20°57′44″S 118°1′26″E	
Parker Rock	32°1′38″S 115°31′24″E	
Parkyerring Rock	32°31′52″S 117°13′8″E	
Passage Rock	32°19′48″S 115°41′23″E	
Passage Rock	32°6′6″S 115°38′27″E	
Patt Rock	32°26′6″S 117°16′34″E	
Pavement Rock	33°54′28″S 122°58′21″E	
Pearce Rock	34°4′24″S 123°8′49″E	
Pedan Rocks	29°51′11″S 117°10′51″E	
Peedhal Rocks	29°45′53″S 117°13′30″E	
Pelican Rock	16°26′1″S 123°12′36″E	
Pelican Rock	35°0′12″S 116°42′22″E	
Pelican Rocks	20°39′17″S 117°14′23″E	
Penguin Rock	34°14′9″S 123°14′44″E	
Perkins Rock	33°58′40″S 119°21′12″E	
Perseverance Rocks	20°40′20″S 117°12′9″E	
Peter Rock	32°34′33″S 119°19′9″E	
Petersen Rock	20°47′54″S 116°5′24″E	
Petrified Forest	35°0′24″S 117°14′19″E	
Petrudor Rocks	30°25′32″S 116°57′55″E	
Phillip Rock	32°0′1″S 115°33′32″E	
Pigeon Rocks	29°55′17″S 119°16′20″E	
Pilaming Rock	30°31′6″S 120°28′21″E	
Pillar Rock	16°24′24″S 123°19′30″E	
Pillar Rock	24°52′8″S 113°7′25″E	
The Pimple	32°34′5″S 119°18′21″E	
Pindaring Rocks	28°10′56″S 115°41′0″E	
Pine Tree Rocks	25°52′9″S 127°32′44″E	
Pinerngutta Rock	32°40′25″S 123°53′25″E	
Pingeculling Rock	32°25′30″S 117°6′18″E	
Pinjardinia Rock	33°8′11″S 123°32′51″E	
Pinnacle Rock	18°48′55″S 121°38′19″E	
Pinnacle Rocks	32°11′23″S 115°44′39″E	
The Pinnacles	30°38′49″S 115°12′28″E	
Pittosporum Rock	30°12′36″S 119°50′8″E	
Plover Rock	32°8′29″S 120°41′47″E	
Pointer Rock	32°6′55″S 115°39′36″E	
Poison Rocks	28°42′7″S 118°30′38″E	
Police Rock	31°0′48″S 118°58′23″E	
Pompey's Pillar	16°36′53″S 128°12′53″E	
Ponier Rock	32°56′13″S 123°29′30″E	
Ponton Rock	33°18′56″S 123°30′20″E	
Poodada Rocks	27°21′29″S 116°41′56″E	
Poor Cat Rocks	29°34′54″S 116°51′33″E	
Popes Nose Rock	20°38′33″S 117°11′9″E	
Porpoise Rocks	34°59′40″S 117°20′57″E	
Portal Rock	34°18′35″S 121°46′29″E	
Pot Rock	33°54′35″S 121°54′23″E	
Prancing Rocks	20°36′55″S 117°43′37″E	
Prudhoe Rocks	14°23′37″S 125°15′18″E	
Puntaping Rock	33°19′35″S 117°23′48″E	
Purnta Rock	32°50′31″S 119°32′37″E	

== Q ==
Name	Coordinates	Remarks
Quairnie Rock	31°15′40″S 121°4′32″E	
Querkedda Rock	29°19′48″S 117°38′45″E	
Quinns Rocks	31°41′5″S 115°40′41″E	
Quins Castle	31°4′43″S 115°29′0″E	
Quoin Rock	34°9′45″S 115°1′25″E	

== R ==
Name	Coordinates	Remarks
Raes Rock	30°52′29″S 119°10′22″E	
Rainy Rocks	29°40′2″S 119°33′43″E	
Ransonnet Rocks	26°9′49″S 113°12′51″E	
Rattigan Rocks	18°14′17″S 126°10′20″E	
Rays Rock	33°4′56″S 123°34′3″E	
Rays Rocks	28°55′43″S 119°8′8″E	
Recherche Rock	34°17′59″S 122°54′18″E	
Red Granite Rock	26°55′23″S 117°12′40″E	
Red Rock	26°14′17″S 118°16′48″E	
Red Rock	25°20′43″S 117°59′25″E	
Red Rock	26°3′29″S 127°37′48″E	
Red Rock	21°2′44″S 119°56′39″E	
Red Roo Rock	32°21′16″S 121°15′39″E	
Retreat Rock	29°3′42″S 119°14′57″E	
Rice Rocks	15°28′59″S 124°24′23″E	
Right Whale Rock	33°57′13″S 122°28′29″E	
Rimolin Rocks	31°51′22″S 117°22′45″E	
Ringbolt Rock	34°59′53″S 117°56′55″E	
Rip Rock	16°24′8″S 123°13′28″E	
Ripple Rock	14°27′43″S 125°0′58″E	
Robber Rocks	16°47′7″S 122°1′8″E	
Roe Rock	34°31′7″S 119°10′3″E	
Roes Rock	33°58′49″S 119°23′42″E	
Roly Rock	20°30′2″S 116°30′20″E	
Ronsard Rocks	30°29′29″S 115°2′53″E	
Rowboat Rock	32°5′6″S 115°39′54″E	
Rowley Rock	19°4′37″S 125°26′36″E	
Rug Rock	34°1′7″S 121°38′42″E	
Rundle Rock	29°45′58″S 120°14′46″E	
Russell Rock	34°3′21″S 123°9′46″E	

== S ==
Name	Coordinates	Remarks			
Sail Rock	34°2′44″S 122°45′23″E				
Sail Rock	33°34′36″S 115°5′23″E				
Sailor Rock	34°5′1″S 123°11′45″E				
Sandalwood Rock	31°41′59″S 119°2′10″E				
Sandalwood Rocks	32°1′50″S 119°57′21″E				
Sandford Rocks	31°13′49″S 118°45′30″E				
Sandplain Rocks	32°50′55″S 119°1′48″E				
Santo Rock	21°38′5″S 114°46′14″E				
Scamp Rock	32°5′34″S 120°44′45″E				
Scobell Rocks	15°54′5″S 123°41′10″E				
Scorpion Rock	29°49′58″S 120°19′0″E				
Scotsman Rock	34°15′55″S 115°1′23″E				
Scott Rocks	33°27′37″S 123°30′31″E				
Scrivener Rocks	32°20′10″S 118°48′46″E				
Seal Rock	32°5′28″S 115°40′0″E				
Seal Rock	34°21′34″S 119°33′54″E				
Seal Rock	34°1′14″S 121°39′14″E				
Sealion Rock	34°1′11″S 121°37′29″E				
Second Rock	32°18′55″S 115°41′19″E				
Second Sister	28°29′8″S 113°44′25″E				
Seeneys Rocks	34°30′55″S 116°38′43″E				
Sewell Rock	32°33′7″S 117°46′49″E				
Shag Rock	28°12′4″S 114°15′22″E				
Shag Rock	32°7′4″S 115°39′39″E				
Shag Rock	24°54′47″S 113°8′40″E				
Shag Rock	28°28′32″S 113°42′43″E				
Shag Rocks	16°35′54″S 122°45′45″E				
Shark Rock	14°49′34″S 128°22′18″E				
Sheoak Rock	32°19′7″S 119°31′17″E				
Sheridan Rocks	24°9′5″S 128°21′53″E				
Ship Rock	28°55′51″S 113°55′44″E				
Ship Rock	20°38′28″S 116°43′13″E				
The Sisters	32°21′17″S 115°41′20″E				
Skeleton Rock	31°51′22″S 119°27′44″E				
Skippy Rock	33°51′38″S 121°2′11″E				
Skull Rock	29°57′41″S 120°33′52″E				
Slippery Rock	33°38′29″S 115°1′12″E				
Smith Rock	34°3′25″S 121°51′48″E				
Smith Rocks	26°5′40″S 113°24′3″E				
Smooth Rocks	34°30′17″S 119°7′53″E				
Snake Rock	32°35′59″S 118°17′26″E				
Sold Rocks	26°31′3″S 126°29′2″E				
South East Rocks	30°56′48″S 122°37′7″E				
South East Rocks	34°25′25″S 115°12′41″E				
South Rock	34°12′24″S 115°1′10″E				
South Ronsard Rocks	30°30′4″S 115°2′58″E				
South West Rock	34°14′19″S 114°59′29″E				
South West Rock	20°39′35″S 116°41′33″E				
South West Rock	32°7′25″S 115°39′28″E				
Spear Rock	31°49′13″S 120°32′47″E				
Sphinx Rock	35°1′19″S 117°21′21″E				
Sphinx Rock	15°8′10″S 128°12′20″E				
Spinifex Rock	31°56′31″S 120°38′26″E				
Split Rock	35°11′14″S 117°52′22″E				
Split Rock	16°21′57″S 123°27′0″E				
Split Rock	29°19′19″S 121°31′44″E				
Split Rock	29°21′53″S 121°7′52″E				
Split Rocks	30°17′8″S 121°23′13″E				
Split Rocks	31°56′49″S 119°39′37″E				
Spout Rock	34°24′43″S 115°10′33″E				
Spring Granite	25°53′59″S 126°43′59″E				
Square Rock	34°25′14″S 115°12′28″E				
Square Rock	34°1′2″S 121°38′21″E				
Star Rock	34°59′55″S 117°20′21″E				
Star Rocks	20°40′47″S 117°11′55″E				
Steamer Rock	13°55′34″S 126°42′39″E				
Steep Rocks	33°55′47″S 121°58′59″E				
Stennet Rock	32°35′51″S 121°33′40″E				
Stewart Rocks	20°51′36″S 115°55′37″E				
Straggler Rocks	32°4′1″S 115°38′0″E				
Strawberry Rocks	31°27′27″S 119°16′45″E		-	Stromatolite Rocks (Hamelin Pool Stromatolites)	31°27′27″S 119°16′45″E
Style Rock	33°7′32″S 121°48′0″E				
Submarine Rock	20°22′37″S 115°33′32″E				
Sugarloaf Rock	33°33′39″S 115°0′12″E				
Sugg Rock	32°57′47″S 119°38′49″E				
Sulphur Rock	32°11′7″S 115°40′54″E				
Sunday Surprise Rocks	27°57′27″S 125°0′9″E				
Sunk Rocks	34°0′14″S 121°46′29″E				
Surface Rock	32°8′58″S 115°39′31″E				
Surprise Rock	28°57′17″S 119°30′19″E				
Swadling Rocks	29°54′0″S 114°57′41″E				
Swallow Rock	33°7′34″S 120°14′38″E				
Swan Rock	34°59′32″S 117°28′17″E				
Sweep Rock	33°53′17″S 122°0′17″E				
Swell Rocks	33°55′18″S 121°49′9″E				
Swirl Rock	17°58′8″S 122°10′13″E				

== See also ==
- Geography of Western Australia
- Granite outcrops of Western Australia
- List of rocks in Western Australia, A-B, plus numerals
- List of rocks in Western Australia, C-E
- List of rocks in Western Australia, F-K
- List of rocks in Western Australia, L-N
- List of rocks in Western Australia, T-Z
