= Nelson Channel =

Channel in the South Sandwich Islands

Coordinates: 57°3′S 26°43′W

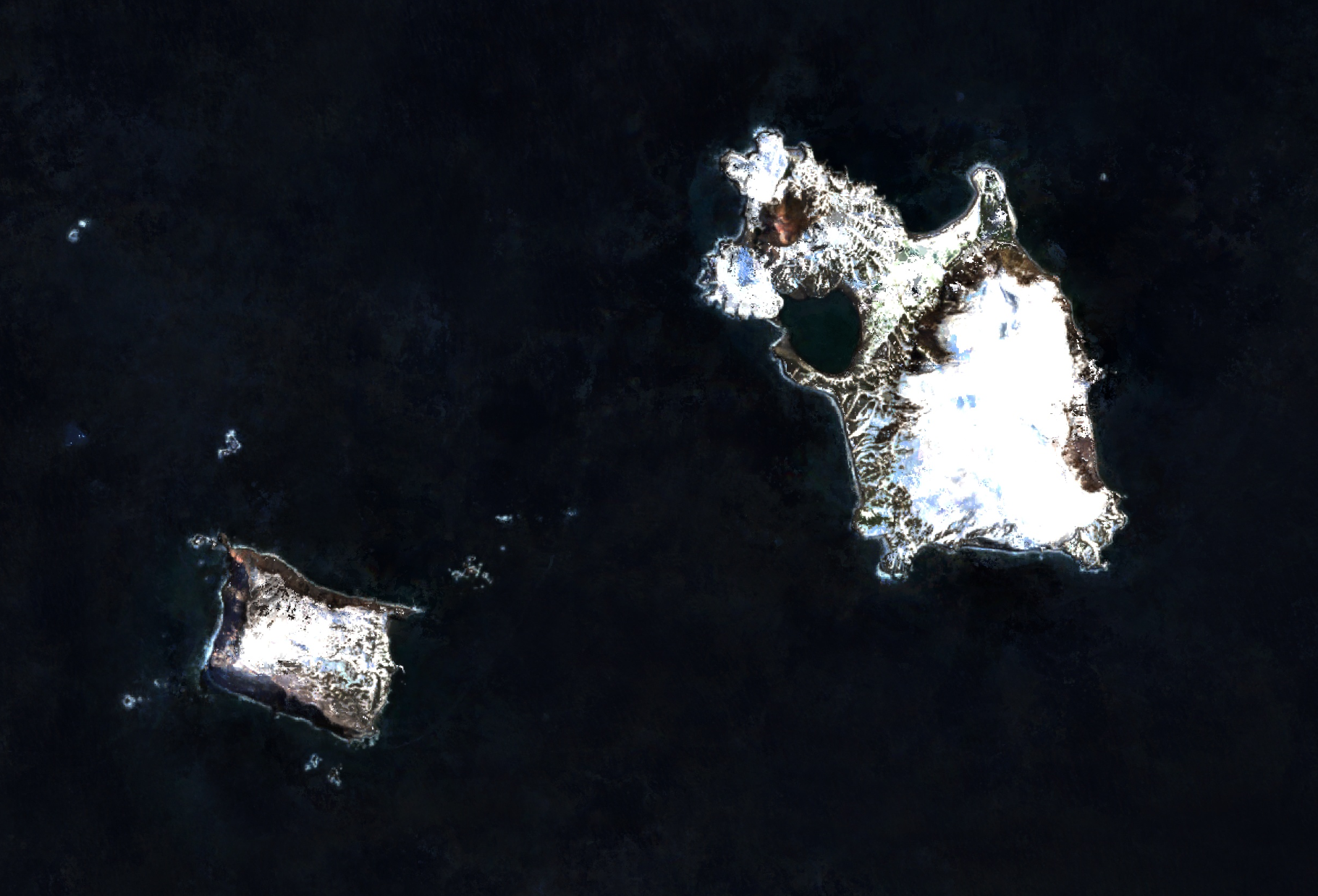
Vindication Island (left) and Candlemas Island.

Nelson Channel is a navigable channel between Candlemas and Vindication Island in Candlemas Islands group, in the South Sandwich Islands. First roughly charted by Captain James Cook, discoverer of these islands in 1775. Recharted in 1930 by DI personnel on the Discovery II, who gave the name "Nelson Strait" for Lieutenant Andrew Laidlaw Nelson, Royal Navy Reserve, chief officer and navigator of the ship. The name has been amended to avoid duplication with Nelson Strait in the South Shetland Islands.
