= Leafvein Gulch =

Valley on Vindication Island, South Sandwich Islands

Leafvein Gulch (57°6′S 26°46′W) is a valley 0.5 nautical miles (1 km) long with intensely gullied flanks, draining the northeastern part of Vindication Island in the South Sandwich Islands. Its lower end lies southwest of Braces Point on the east coast of the island. The name, applied by the UK Antarctic Place-Names Committee in 1971, derives from the pattern of the gullies which recall the radiating veins of a leaf.
