= Knob Point =

Knob Point may refer to:

- Knob Point (Ross Island), a point on the west coast of Hut Point Peninsula on Ross Island, Antarctica
- Knob Point (South Sandwich Islands), the southwesternmost point of Vindication Island in the South Sandwich Islands, Antarctica
