= Crosscut =

Crosscut may refer to:

- Crosscut.com, a former online newspaper in Seattle
- Crosscut Peak, a mountain peak in Antarctica
- Crosscut Point, a rocky point in the South Sandwich Islands
- CrossCut Records, a German record company
- A cut made by a crosscut saw, more commonly spelled "cross cut"
- Mount Crosscut, a mountain in New Zealand

== See also ==
- Cross cut (disambiguation)
