= Sarandi =

Sarandi may refer to:

Geography

- Sarandí, Buenos Aires, a city in Buenos Aires Province, Argentina
- Sarandi, Paraná, a municipality in Paraná, Brazil
- Sarandi, Rio Grande do Sul, a municipality in Rio Grande do Sul, Brazil
- Sarandí del Arapey, a village in the Salto Department of northwestern Uruguay
- Sarandí Grande, a town in the Florida Department of central Uruguay
- Sarandí del Yi, a town in the Durazno Department of central Uruguay

History

- Battle of Sarandí, a battle in the Cisplatine War

Sport

- Arsenal de Sarandí, an Argentine football club

Media

- CX 8 Radio Sarandí, a Uruguayan radio station

Transport

- ARA Sarandí was the name given to 3 ships of the Argentine Navy
- Sarandí (1841), a sail corvette of the Uruguayan Navy
