= Santa Rock =

Santa Rock (57°2′S 26°48′W) is a rock, 35 m high, lying 1.5 nautical miles (2.8 km) north-northwest of Vindication Island in the South Sandwich Islands. It was charted and named in 1930 by DI personnel on the Discovery II.
