= Saw Rock =

Rock formation in the South Sandwich Islands

Saw Rock (57°3′S 26°47′W) is a rock, 25 m high, lying 0.4 nautical miles (0.7 km) north of Crosscut Point, the north extremity of Vindication Island, in the South Sandwich Islands. Charted in 1930 by DI personnel on the Discovery II and named by them, probably for association with Crosscut Point.
