= List of rocks in Western Australia (F–K) =

This list includes all gazetted rocks, boulders, pinnacles, crags, needles, pillars, rock formations, and tors in Western Australia, both inland and offshore. It does not include monoliths gazetted as mounts or hills, such as Mount Augustus. It is complete with respect to the 1996 Gazetteer of Australia. Dubious names have been checked against the online 2004 data, and in all cases confirmed correct. However, if any rocks have been gazetted or deleted since 1996, this list does not reflect these changes. Strictly speaking, Australian place names are gazetted in capital letters only; the names in this list have been converted to mixed case in accordance with normal capitalisation conventions. Locations are as gazetted; some large rock formations may extend over large areas.

See List of rocks in Western Australia for more.

== F ==
| Name | Coordinates | Remarks |
|---|---|---|
| Family Rocks | 35°5′56″S 117°51′0″E | |
| Farren Rock | 30°54′11″S 119°5′43″E | |
| Fathom Rock | 14°42′48″S 128°13′50″E | |
| First Rock | 32°18′47″S 115°41′16″E | |
| Fish Rock | 14°6′27″S 126°41′28″E | |
| Fish Rocks | 32°5′12″S 115°43′47″E | |
| Five Fingers | 30°28′58″S 115°1′1″E | |
| Flat Rock | 28°11′16″S 114°13′55″E | |
| Flat Rock | 30°45′39″S 115°9′52″E | |
| Flat Rock | 34°51′13″S 116°4′43″E | |
| Flat Rock | 32°7′38″S 115°39′51″E | |
| Flat Rock | 35°5′29″S 117°57′40″E | |
| Flat Rocks | 32°28′41″S 121°38′59″E | |
| The Flat Rocks | 30°39′31″S 117°9′19″E | |
| Fleetwood Rock | 16°11′38″S 123°20′30″E | |
| Foal Rock | 16°22′54″S 123°6′19″E | |
| Foam Rocks | 34°7′50″S 122°50′42″E | |
| Forrest Rock | 14°6′23″S 125°52′27″E | |
| Fortescue Rock | 20°56′27″S 116°1′29″E | |
| Four Rocks | 32°13′56″S 119°6′30″E | |
| Frank Rock | 31°2′8″S 116°58′58″E | |
| Franklin Rock | 33°49′00″S 123°45′20″E | |
| Fraser Rock | 16°6′59″S 123°4′58″E | |
| Fraser Rocks | 30°7′48″S 118°1′31″E | |
| Frog Rock | 31°29′46″S 119°13′54″E | |
| Frome Rocks | 18°13′15″S 123°37′50″E | |
| Frustration Rock | 27°41′34″S 114°9′23″E | |
| Fur Rock | 34°0′50″S 121°38′20″E | |
| Fury Rock | 33°59′50″S 121°42′24″E | |
| Fury Rock | 13°58′42″S 125°58′31″E | |

== G ==
| Name | Coordinates | Remarks |
|---|---|---|
| Gabbling Rock | 29°39′44″S 120°23′46″E | |
| Gabenyering Rock | 30°47′41″S 120°13′56″E | |
| Galah Rocks | 29°41′38″S 120°14′43″E | |
| Gannet Rock | 33°34′13″S 115°5′14″E | |
| Garbabarlobulla Rock | 33°5′57″S 123°22′40″E | |
| Garden Granite Rock | 27°30′19″S 118°2′25″E | |
| Garden Granites | 27°27′41″S 118°1′11″E | |
| Gardner Rock | 34°8′31″S 123°8′59″E | |
| Geelakin Rock | 30°58′41″S 118°37′25″E | |
| Geeraning Rock | 30°31′35″S 118°35′52″E | |
| Geordie Rock | 32°56′30″S 121°23′7″E | |
| Geranium Rock | 29°56′52″S 117°14′43″E | |
| Ghost Rocks | 29°33′31″S 120°53′31″E | |
| Giant Rocks | 34°10′39″S 121°39′32″E | |
| Giants Causeway | 34°39′36″S 118°43′20″E | |
| Gibb Rock | 32°7′10″S 119°1′0″E | |
| Gibraltar Rock | 33°29′45″S 116°11′36″E | |
| Gibraltar Rock | 34°40′16″S 117°51′17″E | |
| Gibraltar Rock | 29°12′21″S 121°11′58″E | |
| Gibson Honman Rock | 30°50′36″S 121°25′40″E | |
| Gig Rocks | 33°55′29″S 121°45′52″E | |
| Gilbert Rock | 16°28′57″S 123°2′30″E | |
| Gilgarna Rock | 30°20′53″S 122°25′35″E | |
| Gillian Rock | 29°55′35″S 117°53′8″E | |
| Gilmore Rocks | 32°37′51″S 121°25′36″E | |
| Glen Rhynn Rocks | 30°37′39″S 119°36′58″E | |
| Glenelg Rock | 31°56′0″S 118°47′7″E | |
| Gnabberdocking Rock | 30°42′25″S 119°4′15″E | |
| Gnaragnunging Rock | 30°13′18″S 117°57′27″E | |
| Gnarlbine Rock | 31°8′54″S 120°57′22″E | |
| Goodoona Rock | 27°29′18″S 117°17′6″E | |
| Gorgarlamninya Rock | 32°35′48″S 123°37′4″E | |
| Gorge Rock | 32°27′19″S 117°59′54″E | |
| Grace Rock | 34°10′51″S 115°0′45″E | |
| Graham Rock | 32°27′38″S 119°2′56″E | |
| Grandstand Rock | 27°48′28″S 114°6′46″E | |
| Granite Rock | 31°33′16″S 121°24′9″E | |
| Granite Rock | 27°24′29″S 117°41′9″E | |
| Greens Rock | 29°36′28″S 116°46′2″E | |
| Gregory Rocks | 27°39′1″S 114°13′35″E | |
| Grey Rocks | 20°38′18″S 117°11′16″E | |
| Gull Rock | 35°1′21″S 117°59′42″E | |
| Gull Rock | 32°16′48″S 115°41′25″E | |
| Gull Rock | 33°32′42″S 115°0′17″E | |
| Gunboat Rock | 20°22′40″S 115°33′30″E | |
| Gunering Rock | 32°43′39″S 117°37′13″E | |

== H ==
| Name | Coordinates | Remarks |
|---|---|---|
| H.T. Granites | 27°43′4″S 123°5′16″E | |
| Hadley Rock | 16°22′34″S 123°11′36″E | |
| Halag Rock | 29°38′16″S 120°11′24″E | |
| Hall Rock | 33°24′15″S 118°46′28″E | |
| Halls Rock | 34°42′21″S 117°56′35″E | |
| Hanging Rock | 22°30′18″S 121°39′51″E | |
| Hanging Rock | 35°2′51″S 117°41′41″E | |
| Harbutt Rock | 32°7′16″S 120°51′59″E | |
| Harding Rock | 32°10′3″S 115°40′43″E | |
| Hat Rock | 20°40′15″S 117°17′2″E | |
| Haul Off Rock | 34°42′10″S 118°39′33″E | |
| Hayman Rock | 21°42′46″S 114°40′50″E | |
| Hayward Rock | 22°4′41″S 114°24′49″E | |
| Hazlett Rocks | 26°9′8″S 128°54′27″E | |
| Hector Rock | 33°59′44″S 121°41′44″E | |
| Heinsman Rock | 33°7′1″S 123°27′3″E | |
| Henrietta Rocks | 32°0′51″S 115°32′22″E | |
| Herald Rock | 16°26′9″S 123°26′25″E | |
| Herald Rocks | 35°1′44″S 118°2′12″E | |
| Herring Rock | 35°3′8″S 116°52′19″E | |
| High Rock | 31°22′7″S 119°42′55″E | |
| Hinemoa Rock | 32°1′0″S 115°46′47″E | |
| Holland Rocks | 33°21′28″S 118°44′46″E | |
| Holt Rock | 32°40′43″S 119°24′51″E | |
| Honeycomb Rocks | 34°15′49″S 115°1′22″E | |
| Horse Fall Rocks | 28°41′37″S 119°32′24″E | |
| Horse Rocks | 31°7′20″S 121°24′5″E | |
| Hospital Rocks | 29°49′51″S 120°6′52″E | |
| Huandanning Rock | 31°19′10″S 117°43′4″E | |
| Hughden Rock | 30°16′12″S 117°1′32″E | |
| Hyden Rock | 32°26′45″S 118°54′2″E | |

== I ==
| Name | Coordinates | Remarks |
|---|---|---|
| Inner 7 Foot Rock | 30°35′4″S 115°3′46″E | |
| Inside Rock | 33°55′5″S 120°33′41″E | |
| Inside Rocks | 34°12′55″S 115°1′36″E | |
| Isaacs Rock | 34°2′38″S 114°59′47″E | |
| Island Rock | 27°49′36″S 114°6′34″E | |
| Ive Rock | 30°42′39″S 120°4′43″E | |
| Ivor Rocks | 28°25′3″S 122°55′45″E | |
| Ivy Rock | 14°4′39″S 125°46′11″E | |

== J ==
| Name | Coordinates | Remarks |
|---|---|---|
| Jack Rocks | 32°22′45″S 116°7′58″E | |
| Jackson Rock | 32°48′56″S 119°51′5″E | |
| Jackson Rock | 32°1′35″S 115°34′54″E | |
| Jam Patch Rock | 32°35′30″S 118°35′45″E | |
| James Rocks | 32°6′16″S 115°45′34″E | |
| Jandy Rock | 29°7′14″S 119°45′27″E | |
| Jilakin Rock | 32°40′3″S 118°19′33″E | |
| Jilbadgie Rocks | 31°28′51″S 119°13′34″E | |
| Jinadarra Rock | 30°28′24″S 118°40′59″E | |
| Joan Rock | 32°1′0″S 115°33′5″E | |
| Johnson Rocks | 29°48′15″S 119°49′26″E | |
| Jonah Rock | 32°32′16″S 119°27′53″E | |
| Journalogwin Rock | 30°48′31″S 119°12′56″E | |
| Juarbiding Rocks | 28°14′37″S 117°24′8″E | |
| Jubilee Rocks | 32°0′48″S 115°33′12″E | |
| Judada Rock | 31°35′25″S 123°44′14″E | |
| Juglah Rock | 30°51′17″S 121°59′10″E | |
| Jumbo Rocks | 34°59′11″S 117°27′4″E | |
| Junana Rock | 33°23′12″S 123°24′10″E | |
| Jureen Rock | 31°36′9″S 117°46′13″E | |
| Juropin Rocks | 32°6′35″S 117°27′38″E | |
| Juterin Rock | 31°28′18″S 118°8′30″E | |
| Jutson Rocks | 27°52′15″S 123°20′49″E | |
| Jyndabinbin Rocks | 32°25′37″S 122°4′20″E | |

== K ==
| Name | Coordinates | Remarks |
|---|---|---|
| Kadjathalinga Rocks | 27°40′56″S 116°32′5″E | |
| Kalin Granite Rock | 30°41′26″S 123°15′38″E | |
| Kangaroo Rock | 30°46′36″S 119°11′3″E | |
| Kangaroo Rocks | 31°34′38″S 116°24′11″E | |
| Karalee Rock | 31°15′55″S 119°49′25″E | |
| Karembrenin Rock | 31°46′36″S 118°19′49″E | |
| Karolin Rock | 30°59′14″S 118°55′8″E | |
| Karrabein Rocks | 31°32′7″S 116°52′48″E | |
| Karrakatta Rock | 16°20′53″S 123°2′13″E | |
| Kasnabblin Rock | 33°9′40″S 117°47′34″E | |
| Kau Rock | 33°24′26″S 122°19′31″E | |
| Kells Rock | 26°10′32″S 113°12′17″E | |
| Keokanie Rock | 31°3′45″S 118°52′29″E | |
| Kermadec Rocks | 34°5′46″S 122°49′50″E | |
| Kerman Rock | 31°2′45″S 118°54′17″E | |
| Kerrigan Rock | 32°32′49″S 118°57′29″E | |
| Kijanding Rock | 30°28′12″S 118°3′23″E | |
| Kilidwerinia Granite Rock | 32°2′47″S 123°55′46″E | |
| King Rocks | 32°19′12″S 119°9′3″E | |
| Kirgella Rocks | 30°5′5″S 122°49′38″E | |
| Kirk Rock | 32°37′57″S 117°44′22″E | |
| Knapp Rock | 32°6′25″S 120°43′27″E | |
| Knungomen Rock | 30°58′22″S 117°52′45″E | |
| Kodgerning Rock | 31°13′23″S 119°6′54″E | |
| Kokodarrup Rock | 33°54′13″S 117°47′21″E | |
| Koolbunine Rock | 31°42′15″S 116°59′36″E | |
| Koorikin Rock | 32°27′35″S 118°9′9″E | |
| Korbrelkulling Rock | 31°36′19″S 118°10′57″E | |
| Kubbine Rocks | 32°31′56″S 116°49′30″E | |
| Kulbullikin Rock | 31°52′3″S 118°3′39″E | |
| Kuykara Rock | 30°15′21″S 118°56′26″E | |

== See also ==
- Geography of Western Australia
- Granite outcrops of Western Australia
- List of rocks in Western Australia, A-B, plus numerals
- List of rocks in Western Australia, C-E
- List of rocks in Western Australia, L-N
- List of rocks in Western Australia, O-S
- List of rocks in Western Australia, T-Z
