= Lists of rocks in Western Australia =

For lists of rocks in Western Australia, please see:

- List of rocks in Western Australia (A–B), plus numerals
- List of rocks in Western Australia (C–E)
- List of rocks in Western Australia (F–K)
- List of rocks in Western Australia (L–N)
- List of rocks in Western Australia (O–S)
- List of rocks in Western Australia (T–Z)

== See also ==
- Geology of Western Australia
- Granite outcrops of Western Australia
- List of individual rocks
