= Pothole Gulch =

Valley in the South Sandwich Islands

Pothole Valley
- Interactive map of Pothole Valley

Geography
- Coordinates: 57°7′0″S 26°46′0″W

Administration
- Sovereignty in dispute between Argentina and the United kingdom

Pothole Gulch (57°7′S 26°46′W) is a gulch whose bed is broken by numerous potholes, draining the southeast portion of Vindication Island, South Sandwich Islands. The descriptive name was applied by United Kingdom Antarctic Place-Names Committee (UK-APC) in 1971.
