= Chinstrap Point =

Point in the South Sandwich Islands

Coordinates: 57°7′S 26°46′W

Chinstrap Point is the southeast point of Vindication Island, South Sandwich Islands. This feature was named Rocky Point during a survey of the island from RRS Discovery II in 1930, but the name was changed to avoid duplication. The new name applied by the UK Antarctic Place-Names Committee in 1971 refers to the enormous colony of chinstrap penguins on the point.
