= Cook Rock =

Cook Rock (57°4′S 26°45′W) is an arched rock, 45 metres (150 ft) high, lying close east of Trousers Rock and 0.3 nautical miles (0.6 km) northeast of Vindication Island in the South Sandwich Islands. It was charted in 1930 by Discovery Investigations personnel on the Discovery II and named for Captain James Cook.
