= Splinter Crag =

Geographical feature in Antarctica

Splinter Crag (57°5′S 26°48′W) is a wedge-shaped mass of rock, truncated by sheer cliffs on the north and west and falling more gradually to the south, forming the north peak of Vindication Island, South Sandwich Islands. The name applied by United Kingdom Antarctic Place-Names Committee (UK-APC) in 1971 derives from the pinnacled topography of the vicinity.
