= Pollux Rock =

Rock formation south of the South Sandwich Islands

Pollux Rock (57°7′S 26°47′W) is the southern of a pair of large off-lying rocks south of Vindication Island, South Sandwich Islands. This rock, with its neighbour Castor Rock, was named "Castor and Pollux" during the survey of these islands from RRS Discovery II in 1930. In 1971 United Kingdom Antarctic Place-Names Committee (UK-APC) recommended that they be assigned unambiguous names making each individually identifiable, and this has been done by naming the southern one Pollux Rock and the northern one Castor Rock.
