= Castor Rock =

Rock in the South Sandwich Islands

Castor Rock (57°7′S 26°47′W) is the northern of a pair of large off-lying rocks south of Vindication Island, South Sandwich Islands. This rock, with its neighbor Pollux Rock, was named "Castor and Pollux", after the Dioscuri of Greek mythology, during the survey of these islands from RRS Discovery II in 1930. In 1971 the UK Antarctic Place-Names Committee recommended that they be assigned unambiguous names making each individually identifiable, and this has been done by naming the northern one Castor Rock and the southern one Pollux Rock.
