= Cross cut =

Cross-cut, cross cut or cross-cutting may refer to:

- Cross-cutting, a film editing technique
- Cross-cutting concern, a concept in aspect-oriented software development
- Cross-cutting cleavage, a political term
- A cut made by a crosscut saw

== See also ==
- Crosscut (disambiguation)
