= Trousers Rock =

Rock formation in the South Sandwich Islands

Trousers Rock (57°4′S 26°45′W) is a rock with a prominent wave-cut arch, lying immediately west of Cook Rock and 0.3 nautical miles (0.6 km) northeast of Vindication Island in the South Sandwich Islands. Charted in 1930 and given this descriptive name by DI personnel on the Discovery II.
