= Braces Point =

Braces Point (57°6′S 26°46′W) is the northeast point of Vindication Island, South Sandwich Islands in the South Atlantic Ocean.

The feature was named Low Point during the survey from RRS Discovery II in 1930, but the name was changed to avoid duplication. The new name applied by the UK Antarctic Place-Names Committee in 1971 refers to the bifid form of this point (see braces), reaching out to the nearby sea stack of Trousers Rock.
