= Quadrant Peak =

Mountain in the South Sandwich Islands

Highest point
- Elevation: 430 m (1,410 ft)
- Prominence: 430 m (1,410 ft)
- Coordinates: 57°06′S 26°47′W

Geography
- Location: Vindication Island, South Sandwich Islands

Quadrant Peak (Spanish: Pico Cuadrante) is a peak (430 m) forming the summit of Vindication Island, South Sandwich Islands. The peak forms a narrow ridge above the uniform slopes of the original volcanic cone, and is a quadrant of what was probably once a circular mass cone. The peak was named by the United Kingdom Antarctic Place-Names Committee (UK-APC) in 1971.

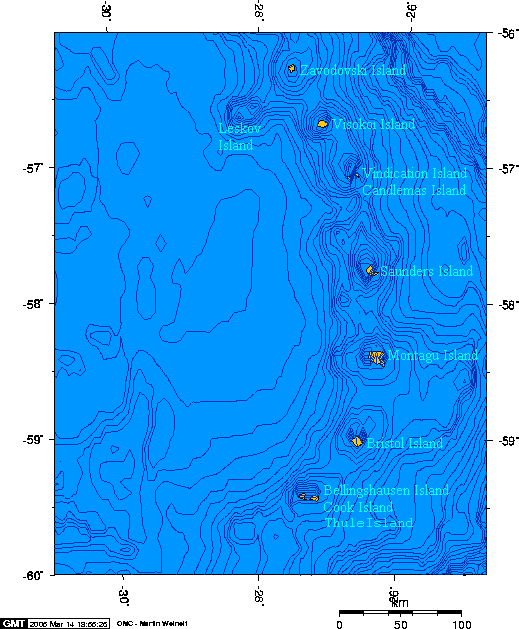
South Sandwich Islands

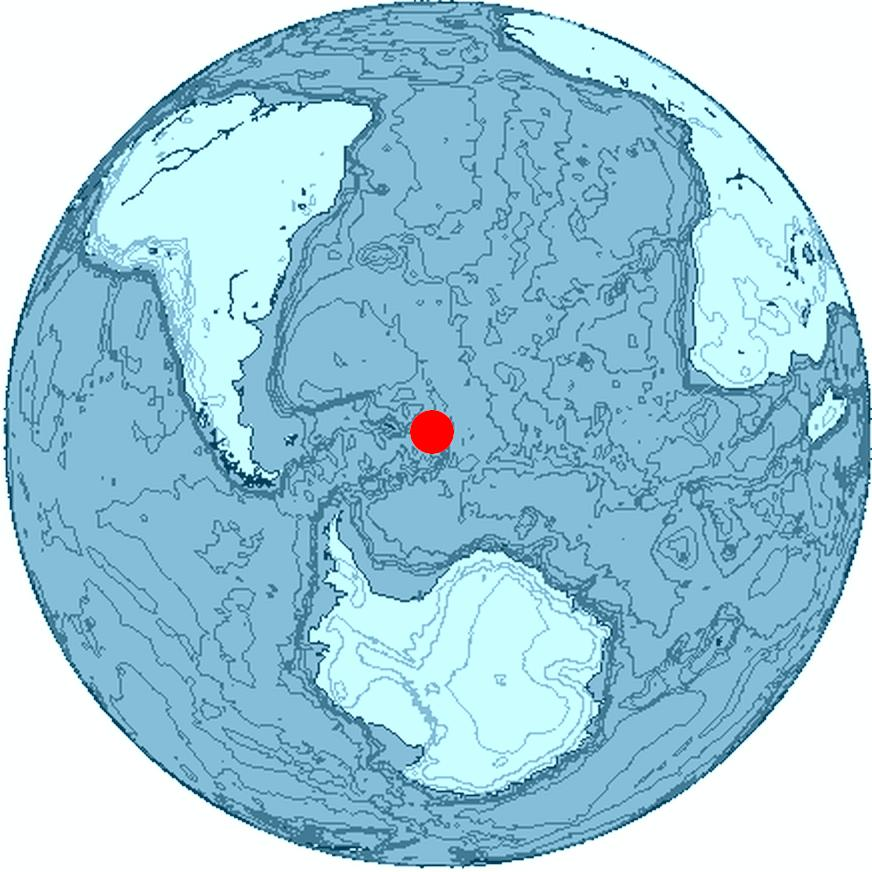
Location of Quadrant Peak, Vindication Island
