= Yardina Rock =

Granite rock formation in Western Australia

Coordinates: 31.6833°S 122.2167°E

Yardina Rock is a granite rock formation located approximately 70 km (43 mi) north east of Norseman and approximately 75 km (47 mi) south east of Kambalda in the Goldfields-Esperance region of Western Australia.

Yardina Soak, an intermittent wetland, is located approximately 1.5 km (0.93 mi) to the west.

== See also ==
- Granite outcrops of Western Australia
