= Low Rock =

Geological feature in Antarctica

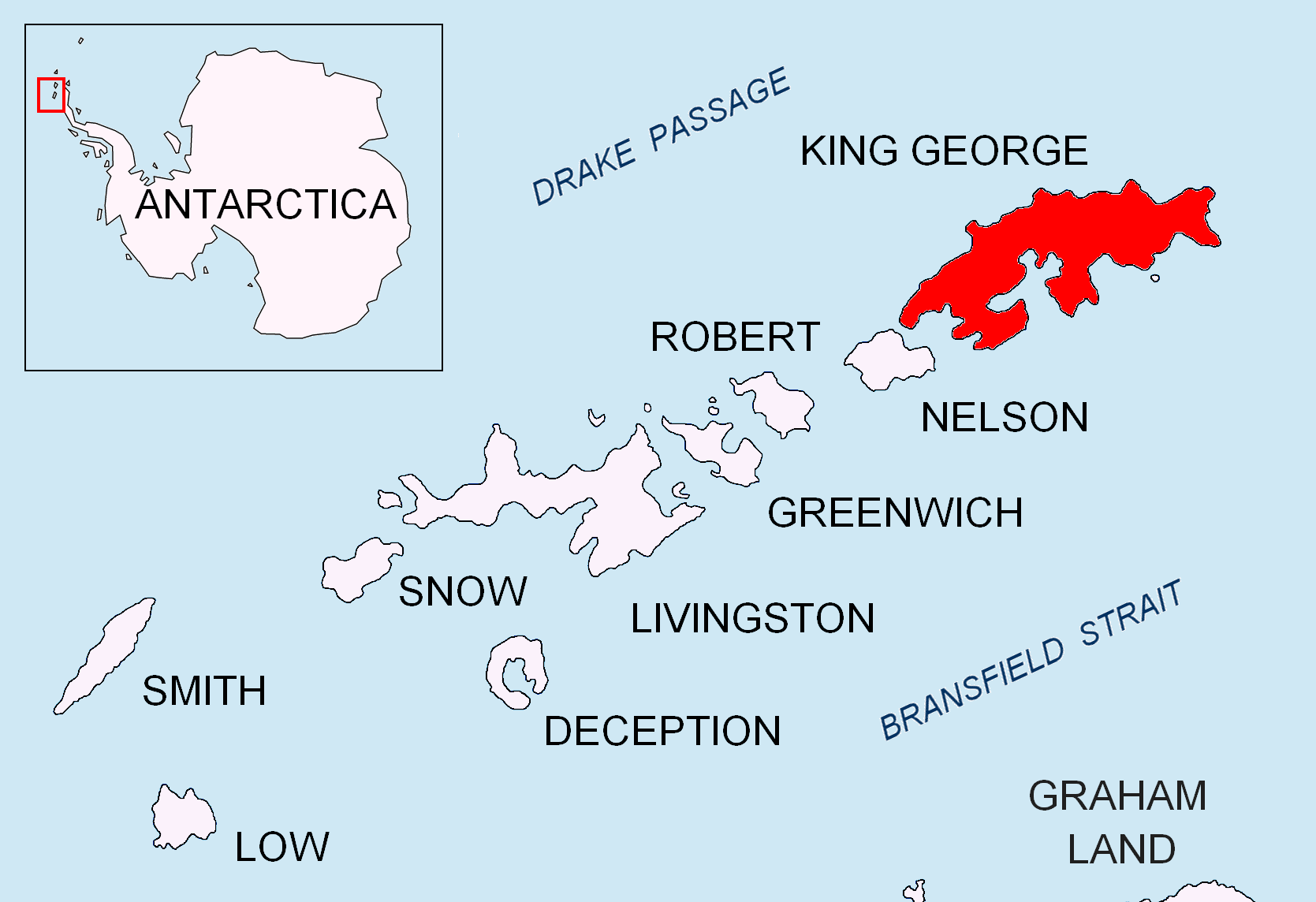
- Location of King George Island in the South Shetland Islands

- Location within Antarctic Peninsula Location within Antarctica

Geography
- Location: Antarctica
- Coordinates: 62°16′43″S 58°38′20″W

Administration
- Administered under the Antarctic Treaty System

Demographics
- Population: Uninhabited

Low Rock is a low rock surrounded by foul ground, lying 2 kilometres (1 nmi) southwest of Stranger Point, the southern extremity of King George Island, in the South Shetland Islands, Antarctica. An unnamed rock in essentially this position appears on a chart by David Ferguson, a Scottish geologist aboard the whaler Hanka, in these waters in 1913–14. Low Rock was more accurately charted by Discovery Investigations personnel on the Discovery II in 1935 and 1937.

== See also ==
- List of Antarctic and subantarctic islands
