= ARA Sarandí =

Several ships of the Argentine Navy have been named Sarandí

- ARA Sarandí (1826), a schooner in service during the Cisplatine War
- ARA Sarandí (P-33), a Tacoma-class frigate in service 1947–1968
- ARA Sarandí (D-13), an Almirante Brown-class destroyer in service since 1984
