= Crosscut Point =

Crosscut Point (57°4′S 26°46′W) is a series of jagged rocks forming the north end of Vindication Island in the South Sandwich Islands. It was charted in 1930 by Discovery Investigations personnel on the Discovery II, and so named because numerous crosscutting dikes have withstood weathering and produced this irregular formation.

== See also ==
- Saw Rock
