= Bay Rock =

Island in New Zealand

- Interactive map of Bay Rock

Geography
- Location: Fiordland
- Coordinates: 46.038167°S 166.535167°E

Administration
- New Zealand
- Region: Southland

Demographics
- Population: uninhabited

Bay Rock is an island in Taiari / Chalky Inlet, in southwest New Zealand. It is in Bad Passage, south of the Passage Islands, most specifically Motutawaki, and is north of Chalky Island.

== See also ==
- List of islands of New Zealand
