= Conical Rock =

Rock formation in Antarctica

Conical Rock (62°43′S 61°11′W) is a rock lying in the eastern part of Morton Strait, 2 nautical miles (4 km) south of the southwest tip of Livingston Island, in the South Shetland Islands. It was named by Discovery Investigations personnel on the Discovery II, who charted the area in 1930–31.
