= Lonely Rock =

Rock rising 7 metres (23 ft) above sea level east of Ula Point, James Ross Island

Coordinates: 64°6′S 57°3′W

Lonely Rock is a rock rising 7 metres (23 ft) above sea level east of Ula Point, James Ross Island, on the west margin of Erebus and Terror Gulf, Antarctica. It was charted by the Falkland Islands Dependencies Survey, 1945, and named "Lone Rock" by the UK Antarctic Place-Names Committee because of its small size and isolation. The name was modified in 1963 to avoid duplication with Lone Rock off Nelson Island.
