= Bare Rock =

Bare Rock (60°43′S 45°36′W) is a rock which lies 0.1 nautical miles (0.2 km) northeast of Berntsen Point in the entrance to Borge Bay, off the west side of Signy Island in the South Orkney Islands rising to an elevation of 1,174 metres (3,852 ft). It was charted and named descriptively by Discovery Investigations personnel on the RRS Discovery in 1927.
