= Yakkan Toort / Dog Rock =

Rock in Western Australia

Coordinates: 35.018940°S 117.885661°E

Dog Rock / Yakkan Toort in Albany, 2026

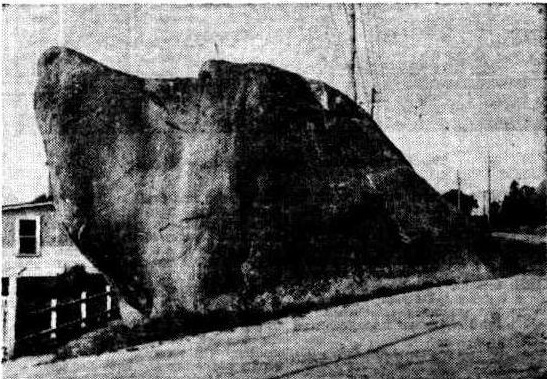
Dog Rock, 1937

Yakkan Toort / Dog Rock is a large, natural granite outcrop that is located along Middleton Road between Middleton Beach and the centre of Albany in the Great Southern region of Western Australia.

The rock is a prominent landmark and has the shape of a dog's head when viewed from the western side, leading to the name. Dog Rock has become a popular tourist attraction for the area. The Noongar people know the rock as Yacka which means "wild dog tamed"; it is thought to be an ancient territorial boundary marker. Local Aboriginal people will not camp near the rock or shelter beneath it, although the reason is not known. There is also an additional part of the site, which is also significant to Noongar people, which is Yakknint (the dog's tail) and it is in front of St Joseph's Catholic Church on Aberdeen Street.

From the earliest days of colonisation in the region it was viewed as a landmark and was described in 1898 as resembling a newfoundland dog. There is a local legend, attributed to the diary of Richard Spencer, who was the government resident from 1833 until his death in 1839, was that, in the early days of the town, a three year old girl, Betty Silverthorne, was left in the care of the family dog which protected her when people attempted to break into the home. In protecting the little girl the dog was killed and the father of the little girl buried the dog and placed a large sandstone boulder over the grave. During the night it is told that there was a large storm and the boulder rolled down the hill and landed where Dog Rock rock now is and that, unlike the day before, it now resembled a dog itself.

In 1921 the Council proposed demolishing the rock with explosives so as to widen the road. The idea was met with protests and petitions along with an angry exchange during a council meeting, resulting in the proposal being quashed.

The Royal Automobile Club labelled the rock a danger to traffic in 1938 as it both encroached onto the road and because children often attempted to run up it and jump off which also startled motorisits. The local authorities then painted the distinctive white collar around the base of the rock to make it more visible.

In the 1960s, the manager of the local radio station 6VA, suggested that the rock should be moved to the roundabout of Albany Highway, Denmark Road, North Road and Chester Pass Road. He believed that this would make it a more central tourist destination, and that the rock could be cut into slices and moved piece by piece and then rebuilt at the new site.

The rock was classified by the National Trust in 1973 and adopted into the municipal inventory in 2001.

The feature was dual named in 2021 to Yakkan Toort / Dog Rock as a part of the City of Albany's Restoring Menang Noongar Place Names project.

== See also ==
- List of individual rocks
- List of places on the State Register of Heritage Places in the City of Albany
