= Candlemas Islands =

Island group of the South Sandwich Islands

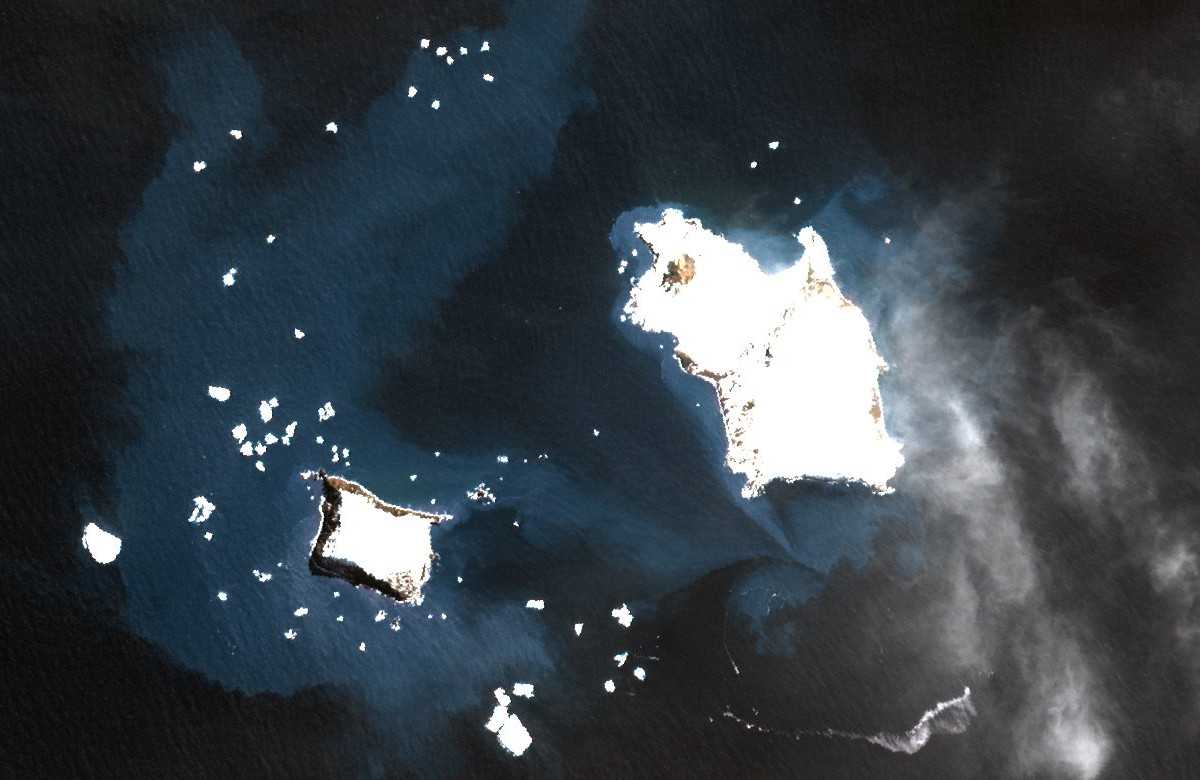
- NASA satellite image of the Candlemas Islands. Candlemas Island is on the right, Vindication Island on the left.

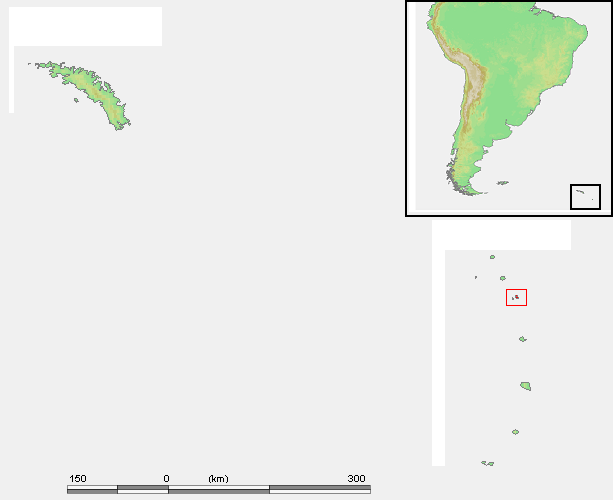
- Location of the Candlemas Islands within the South Sandwich Islands

Geography
- Location: South Atlantic Ocean
- Coordinates: 57°05′S 26°44′W
- Archipelago: South Sandwich Islands
- Total islands: 2 (plus numerous rocks)
- Major islands: Candlemas Island, Vindication Island
- Area: 17 km^{2} (6.6 sq mi)
- Highest elevation: 550 m (1800 ft)
- Highest point: Mount Andromeda

Administration
- United Kingdom
- Territory: South Georgia and the South Sandwich Islands

Demographics
- Population: Uninhabited

The Candlemas Islands (Spanish: Islas Candelaria) are a group of two small, uninhabited volcanic islands in the northern part of the South Sandwich Islands archipelago, in the South Atlantic Ocean. They consist of Candlemas Island and Vindication Island, separated by the 4-kilometre-wide (2.5 mi) Nelson Channel, along with numerous offshore rocks and islets. The group was discovered on 2 February 1775 by Captain James Cook during his second voyage of exploration, and named in commemoration of Candlemas Day, the Christian feast observed on that date.

The islands are part of the British Overseas Territory of South Georgia and the South Sandwich Islands, and are also claimed by Argentina as part of the Tierra del Fuego province. They are uninhabited and rarely visited, with no permanent infrastructure beyond occasional scientific field camps.

== Geography ==
The Candlemas Islands lie at approximately 57°05′S 26°44′W, in the northern sector of the South Sandwich Islands arc. They are situated about 845 kilometres (525 mi) east of South Georgia Island and 37 kilometres (23 mi) southeast of Visokoi Island. The group has a combined land area of approximately 17 square kilometres (6.6 sq mi).

The two main islands are separated by Nelson Channel, which has depths of 50–60 metres (160–200 ft) and is approximately 4 kilometres (2.5 mi) wide. Numerous smaller rocks and islets surround the main islands, including Black Rock near Candlemas Island and Cook Rock, Pantalón Rock, and others near Vindication Island.

=== Candlemas Island ===
Candlemas Island (57°05′S 26°39′W) is the larger of the two, measuring approximately 6 kilometres (3.7 mi) in length and 3 kilometres (1.9 mi) in width, with an area of about 14 square kilometres (5.4 sq mi). The island is dominated by a heavily eroded stratovolcano in its southern half, capped by permanent ice and glaciers. The highest point is Mount Andromeda, reaching 550 metres (1,800 ft) above sea level. The northern part of the island is lower and consists of a complex of scoria cones and lava flows known as Lucifer Hills, which exhibit active fumaroles.

=== Vindication Island ===
Vindication Island (57°06′S 26°47′W) lies approximately 4 kilometres (2.5 mi) west of Candlemas Island. It is smaller, roughly rectangular in shape with dimensions of 2.1 kilometres (1.3 mi) by 1.6 kilometres (0.99 mi), and an area of about 3 square kilometres (1.2 sq mi). The island has a rugged, eroded profile and its highest point is Quadrant Peak, exceeding 430 metres (1,410 ft) in elevation. Unlike Candlemas Island, Vindication Island shows no signs of recent volcanic activity and is mostly ice-free.

== Geology and volcanism ==
The Candlemas Islands are part of the South Sandwich Islands volcanic arc, formed by the subduction of the South American Plate beneath the South Sandwich Plate at the South Sandwich Trench. The islands are composed primarily of basalt, basaltic andesite, andesite, and dacite, reflecting hydrous flux melting above the subducting slab.

Candlemas Island is an active stratovolcano with a complex eruptive history. The southern massif is an older, deeply eroded basaltic edifice with steep eastern cliffs, while the northern Lucifer Hills represent a younger complex of coalesced scoria cones and lava flows that formed within the last few hundred years. Persistent fumarolic activity is observed at Lucifer Hills, with steam vents and sulfur deposits indicating ongoing degassing from a shallow magma body.

Historical reports of eruptions are uncertain. Possible eruptive activity was noted on 6 November 1911, involving explosions and fumarolic emissions on the northwest flank. An account from 1823 described dark brown clouds and white steam rising from the Lucifer Hill area. An uncertain eruption around late 1953 reportedly produced a glowing lava field visible in the northern sector. Modern satellite monitoring has detected thermal anomalies and presumed fumarolic emissions on Candlemas Island during 2000–2010. No confirmed eruptions have occurred in recent decades.

== Climate ==
The Candlemas Islands have a tundra climate (Köppen climate classification: ET), characterized by persistently cold temperatures year-round. The climate is cold, windy, and often overcast, with little seasonal temperature variation.

During the austral summer, average high temperatures reach approximately 4 °C (39 °F), while winter lows average around −6 °C (21 °F). The islands are exposed to cold Antarctic air outbreaks and experience frequent snow and rain. Higher elevations, particularly the glaciated southern portion of Candlemas Island, maintain permanent ice cover and exhibit localized ice cap climate (EF) conditions, but the overall classification for the islands is tundra.

== Ecology ==
Despite the harsh climate, the Candlemas Islands support significant breeding colonies of seabirds and marine mammals, sustained by the nutrient-rich waters of the Antarctic Circumpolar Current.

=== Flora ===
Vegetation is sparse, covering less than 5% of the land surface and confined to sheltered coastal areas and geothermal sites. Non-vascular plants dominate, including approximately 46 lichen species, 38 moss species, and 11 liverwort species recorded across the South Sandwich Islands. The only vascular plant present is Antarctic hair grass (Deschampsia antarctica), which occurs sporadically in moist depressions enriched by guano from seabird colonies.

=== Fauna ===
The islands host globally important populations of several seabird species. Chinstrap penguins (Pygoscelis antarctica) are the most numerous, with an estimated 205,000 breeding pairs recorded in habitat surveys. Adélie penguins (Pygoscelis adeliae) also maintain small nesting colonies.

Southern giant petrels (Macronectes giganteus) form significant breeding aggregations, with Candlemas Island designated as ACAP Site 52 and supporting approximately 1,516 pairs. Other breeding seabirds include Wilson's storm petrel (Oceanites oceanicus), black-bellied storm petrel (Fregetta tropica), and Cape petrel (Daption capense).

Marine mammals visiting the shores include Antarctic fur seals (Arctocephalus gazella), which breed on the islands, as well as non-breeding southern elephant seals (Mirounga leonina), leopard seals (Hydrurga leptonyx), and Weddell seals (Leptonychotes weddellii).

== History ==
=== Discovery ===
The Candlemas Islands were discovered on 2 February 1775 by Captain James Cook during his second voyage of exploration aboard HMS Resolution. Cook sighted the islands amid persistent fog and ice, and named them in commemoration of Candlemas Day, the Christian feast of the Presentation of Jesus at the Temple observed on that date. He described them as twin volcanic peaks rising steeply from the sea, but made no landing due to heavy swells and the islands' precipitous cliffs.

In January 1820, the Russian explorer Fabian Gottlieb von Bellingshausen aboard the ship Vostok confirmed the presence of two separate islands, though he initially mistook the three highest peaks of Candlemas Island for distinct islands. Later expeditions, including those led by Carl Anton Larsen in 1908 and Wilhelm Filchner, incorrectly reported only a single island.

=== Modern exploration ===
The first detailed geological survey was conducted in March 1964 by the British Antarctic Survey (BAS) aboard the RRS John Biscoe, which documented the volcanic stratigraphy, rock compositions, and structural features of Candlemas Island. Landings were brief due to adverse weather and high seas, and no permanent station was established.

In 1930, personnel of the RRS Discovery II carried out further charting, after which the name "Candlemas" was formally applied to the larger island and to the group as a whole. The islands have since been visited sporadically by scientific expeditions and fisheries patrol vessels, but remain among the least accessible and least studied landmasses in the South Atlantic.

== Administration and geopolitics ==
The Candlemas Islands are administered by the United Kingdom as part of the British Overseas Territory of South Georgia and the South Sandwich Islands, established in 1985. The UK's claim dates from the formal annexation of the South Sandwich Islands in 1908, and is based on continuous assertion and effective control through naval patrols and legal administration.

Argentina asserts a competing claim to the islands as part of its Tierra del Fuego province, based on geographical proximity and purported inheritance from Spanish colonial titles. However, Argentina has never established effective administration or permanent presence on the islands, and the UK's sovereignty is widely recognized internationally. The 1982 Falklands War saw Argentine forces occupy Southern Thule, but not the Candlemas Islands, and British control was restored shortly thereafter.

Access to the islands is strictly regulated by the Government of South Georgia and the South Sandwich Islands, requiring a Regulated Activity Permit for any landing. The islands and their surrounding waters are part of the South Georgia and South Sandwich Islands Marine Protected Area, designated in 2012 and expanded in 2023, which prohibits commercial fishing and other extractive activities.

== See also ==
- List of Antarctic islands north of 60° S
- List of sub-Antarctic islands
- South Sandwich Islands
- Candlemas Island
- Vindication Island
