= USS Uniontown =

1943 Tacoma-class frigate

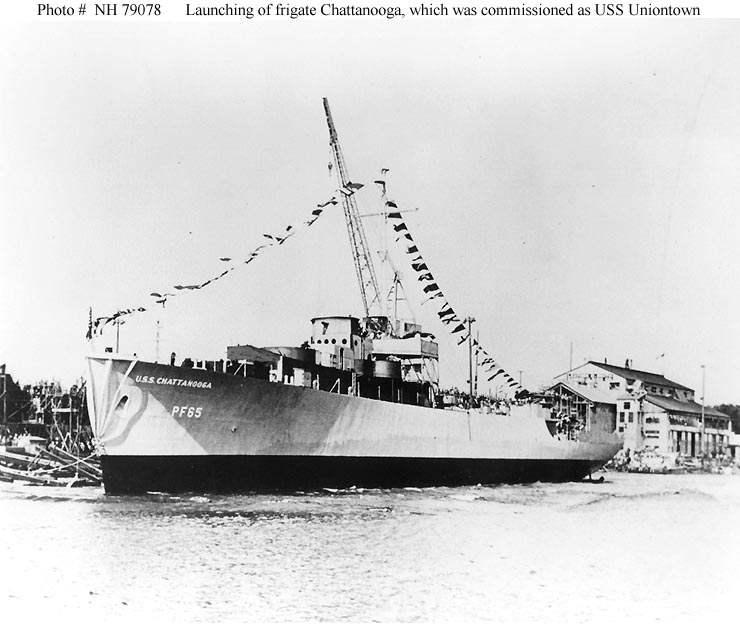
- USS Chattanooga (PF-65) is launched at the Leatham D. Smith Shipbuilding Company shipyard at Sturgeon Bay, Wisconsin, on 7 August 1943, a year before she was renamed USS Uniontown just prior to commissioning.

History

United States
- Name: Chattanooga (1943–1944); Uniontown (1944–1947)
- Namesake: City of Chattanooga, Tennessee; City of Uniontown, Pennsylvania
- Builder: Leatham D. Smith Shipbuilding Company, Sturgeon Bay, Wisconsin
- Laid down: 21 April 1943
- Launched: 7 August 1943
- Commissioned: 6 October 1944
- Decommissioned: 20 December 1945
- Renamed: Uniontown, 16 August 1944
- Reclassified: PF-65, 15 April 1943
- Stricken: 8 January 1946
- Fate: Sold to Argentina, July 1947

Argentina
- Name: Sarandi
- Acquired: July 1947
- Decommissioned: 1968
- Fate: Unknown

General characteristics
- Class & type: Tacoma-class frigate
- Displacement: 1,264 long tons (1,284 t)
- Length: 303 ft 11 in (92.63 m)
- Beam: 37 ft 6 in (11.43 m)
- Draft: 13 ft 8 in (4.17 m)
- Propulsion: 2 × 5,500 shp (4,101 kW) turbines; 3 boilers; 2 shafts
- Speed: 20 knots (37 km/h; 23 mph)
- Complement: 190
- Armament: 3 × 3"/50 dual purpose guns (3x1); 4 x 40 mm guns (2×2); 9 × 20 mm guns (9×1); 1 × Hedgehog anti-submarine mortar; 8 × Y-gun depth charge projectors; 2 × Depth charge tracks

USS Uniontown (PF-65), a Tacoma-class frigate, was the only ship of the United States Navy to be named for Uniontown, Pennsylvania.

== Construction ==
The ship was laid down under a Maritime Commission contract (MC hull 1489) as Chattanooga on 21 April 1943, at Sturgeon Bay, Wisconsin, by the Leathem D. Smith Shipbuilding Company. Launched on 7 August 1943, sponsored by Mrs. Cecilia Daniel, and brought to New Orleans, for completion on 4 April 1944. She was renamed Uniontown on 16 August 1944, to free the name Chattanooga for the Fargo-class light cruiser CL-118, and commissioned on 6 October 1944.

== Service history ==
=== World War II ===
Following shakedown in the Caribbean and a brief visit to Charleston, South Carolina, Uniontown joined Task Force 61 at Hampton Roads, Virginia, on 27 December 1944 for duty as a convoy escort. Two days later, the Coast Guard-crewed escort vessel got underway for the first of three round-trip voyages across the Atlantic, escorting convoys to Oran, Algeria, and back. Her first round trip lasted from 29 December 1944 to 11 February 1945; the second round trip commenced on 15 March and ended with the ship's return to New York on 9 April. On 28 April, Uniontown got underway for North Africa and her last wartime convoy escort run.

While en route to Algeria, Uniontown received word that German forces had surrendered at Rheims on 7 May, ending the long European war. Arriving at Oran on the 13th, Uniontown soon got underway for the United States and reached Philadelphia, on 8 June for conversion to a weather ship. On 3 July, outfitted for weather patrol duties, she set out for Newfoundland, and arrived at NS Argentia two days later.

On 13 July, Uniontown commenced operations at Weather Station No. 3 and remained on station until 2 August. The ship returned to Grønnedal, Greenland, from 3 to 20 August in between deployments on weather patrol. The frigate served on Weather Station No. 1 from 22 August to 11 September, and subsequently at Weather Station No. 3 from 2 to 20 October before she returned to the Boston Navy Yard. A month later, Uniontown headed for Hampton Roads and arrived at Norfolk, Virginia, on 30 November 1945.

=== Postwar ===
On 20 December 1945, the warship was decommissioned at the Norfolk Naval Shipyard, Portsmouth, Virginia, and was struck from the Naval Vessel Register on 8 January 1946.

After being turned over to the State Department Liquidation Commission, she was then sold to the Argentine government in July 1947, in whose service she was renamed ARA Sarandi (P-33). She served until 1968. Fate unknown.
