= Square Rock =

Rock in South Georgia

Square Rock (54°0′S 38°1′W) is a rock lying 0.3 nautical miles (0.6 km) west of Cape Alexandra, at the west end of South Georgia. The name appears to be first used on a 1938 British Admiralty chart.
