= Dome Rock =

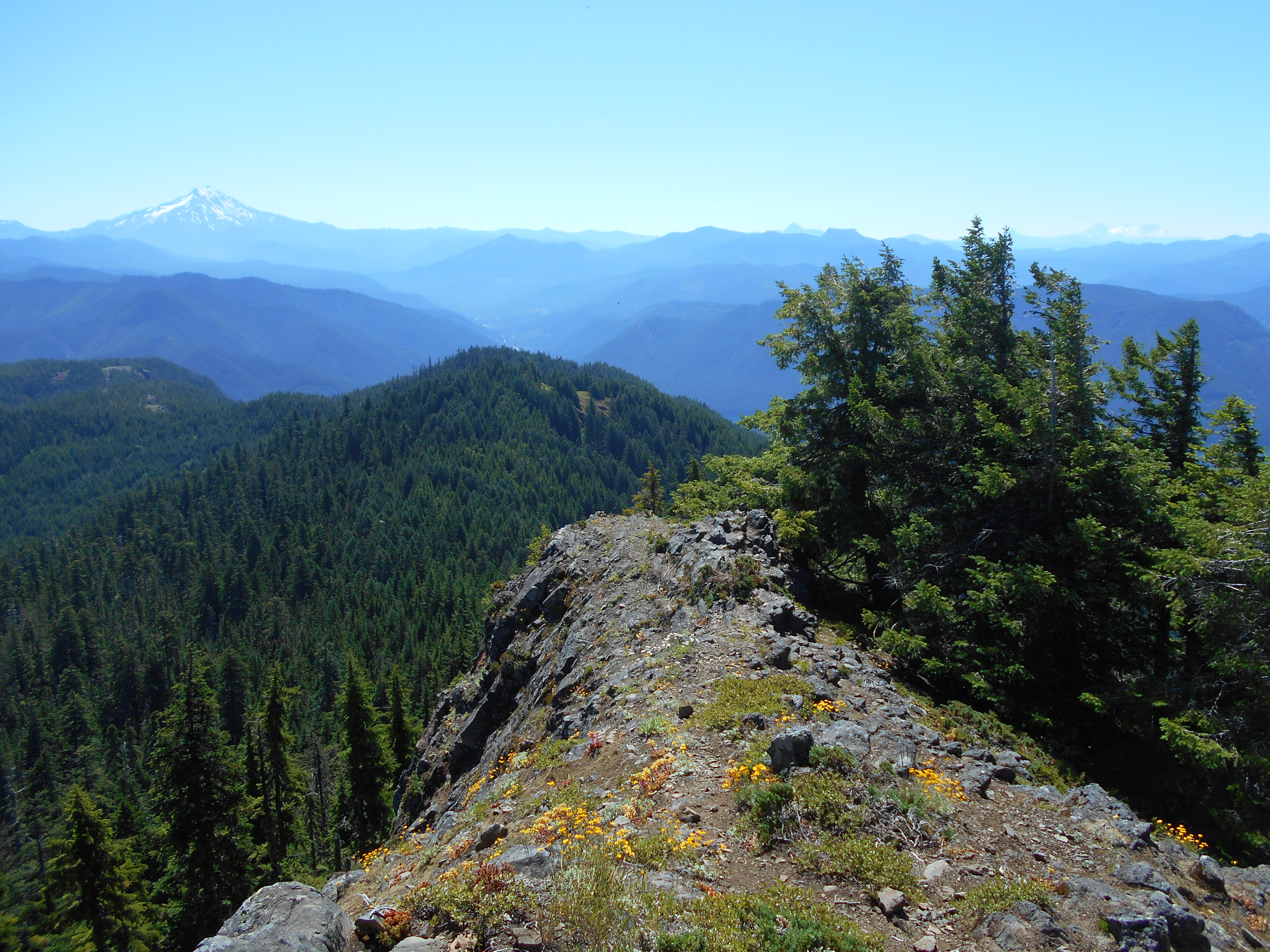
- Looking East from Dome Rock. Mt. Jefferson looms in the distance.

Highest point
- Elevation: 4,859 ft (1,481 m)
- Coordinates: 44°45′10″N 122°12′31″W

Geography
- Location within Oregon
- Location: Marion County
- Parent range: Cascades
- Topo map: TopoZone

Geology
- Mountain type: Andesite Formation

Climbing
- Easiest route: Trail

Dome Rock is an andesite formation of the Old Cascades in the Willamette National Forest. The mountain is best known for its hiking trail that goes to the summit. Dome Rock lies in Linn County, Oregon. About 3 miles southeast of Dome Rock is the small town of Detroit.
