= Ten Mile Rocks =

Granite rock formation in Western Australia

Coordinates: 32°05.6′S 122°39.9′E

Ten Mile Rocks are a granite rock formation approximately 80 km (50 mi) east of Norseman and approximately 111 km (69 mi) west of Balladonia in the Goldfields-Esperance region of Western Australia.

The rocks are part of the Biranup Complex, a belt forming the north western portion of the Albany Fraser geological province on the southern edge of the Yilgarn craton. The rocks themselves are composed of Garnet-biotite monzogranite gneiss with an age of around 1670 million years.

A camping area is near the rocks, about 100 m (330 ft) off Eyre Highway and on the eastern edge of the Fraser Range. The camp site has toilets, picnic table and barbeques with space for 30 vehicles.

The area is of significance to the Ngadjunmaia peoples. On the south side of the rock are Marlpa initiation grounds. The space has been cleared off sticks and stones, and there are many old campfires around it.

== See also ==
- Granite outcrops of Western Australia
