= Vindication Island =

Island in the South Sandwich Islands

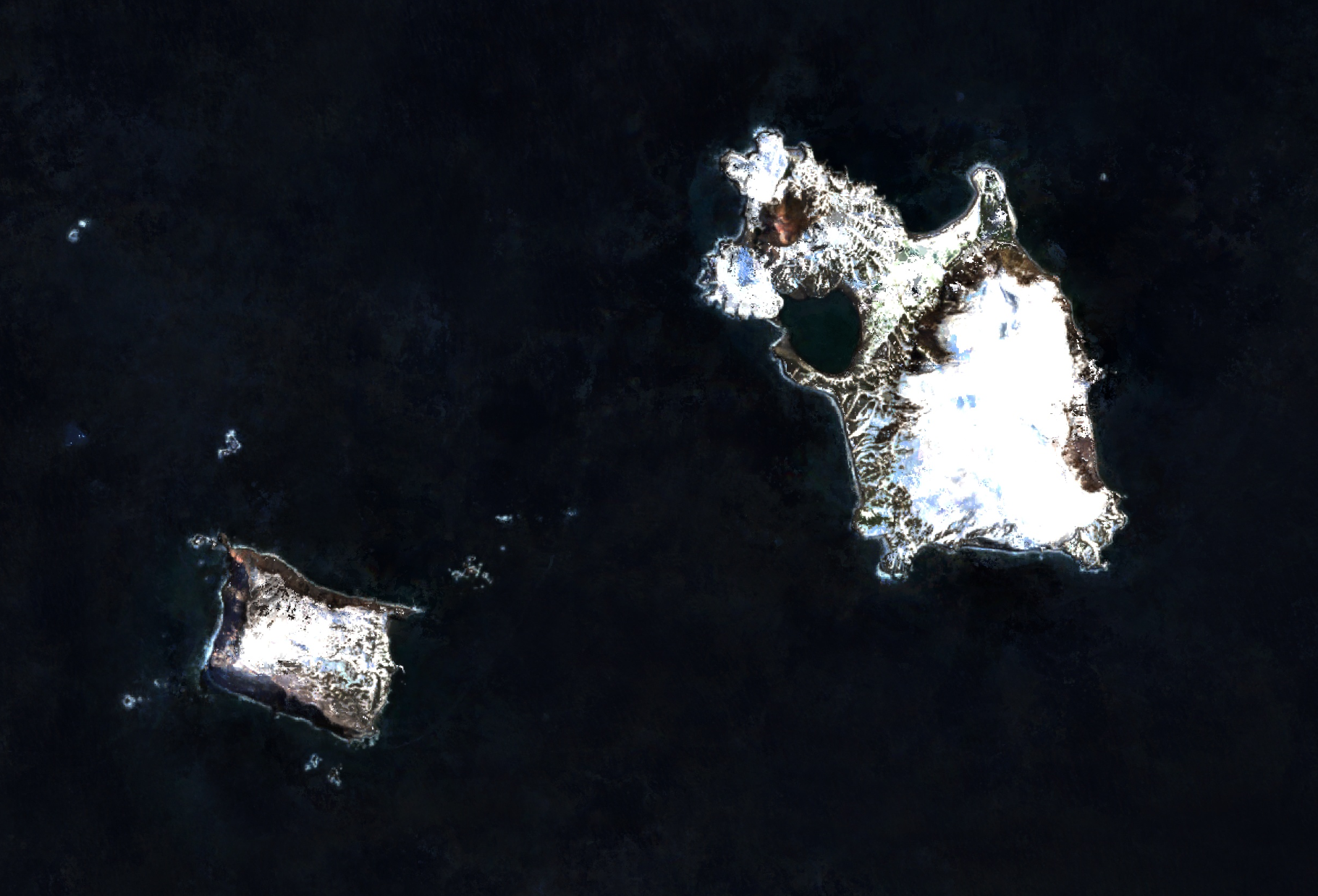
- Sentinel-2 satellite imagery of Vindication Island (left)

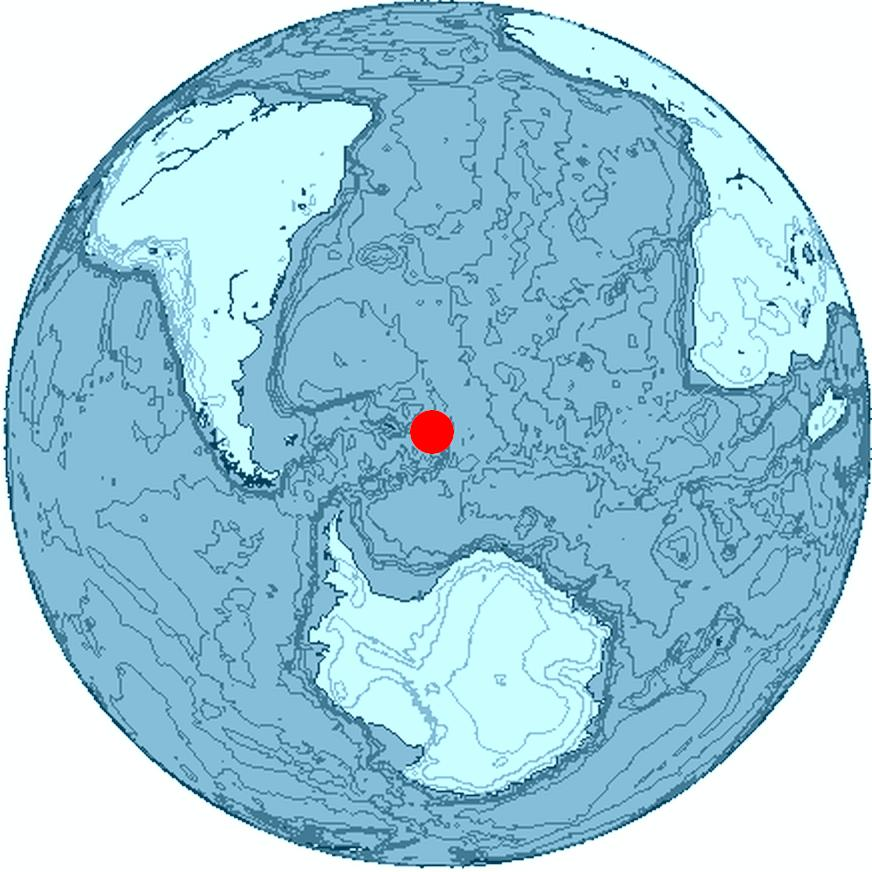
- Location of Vindication Island

Geography
- Coordinates: 57°07′03″S 26°48′54″W
- Area: 3 km^{2} (1.2 sq mi)
- Length: 2.1 km (1.3 mi)
- Width: 1.6 km (0.99 mi)
- Highest elevation: 430 m (1410 ft)
- Highest point: Quadrant Peak

Administration
- United Kingdom
- Territory: South Georgia and the South Sandwich Islands

Demographics
- Population: Uninhabited

Vindication Island is a small uninhabited island of the Candlemas Islands in the South Sandwich Islands. It is one of about a dozen islands that make up the South Sandwich island arc, a chain of volcanoes in the Southern Ocean that was discovered in 1775 by James Cook. The volcanism is caused by the subduction of the South American Plate beneath the Sandwich Plate.

The island has a rectangular outline and is the remnant of three mostly eroded volcanoes. The highest point of the island, Quadrant Peak, directly overlies the coast. Inland Vindication Island features a rich vegetation, consisting of lichens and mosses, while various bird and penguin species breed along the coasts. There is no evidence of recent volcanic activity.

== History and toponymy ==
Vindication and Candlemas Island were both discovered on 2 February 1775 by James Cook aboard HMS Resolution. In 1951–1952 the Argentine frigates ARA Hércules and ARA Sarandí installed a marker on Vindication, claiming Argentine sovereignty over the island; this is the first recorded landing on the island. The British HMS Protector landed a party on Vindication in 1956–1957 as part of a larger operation in the South Sandwich Islands, with other visits from the same ship in 1962 and 1964. In 1961, the RRS Shackleton landed a boat. In May 1975, the Argentine research vessel ARA Islas Orcadas investigated seafloor communities in the channel between Vindication and Candlemas. In January 2011, the MS Golden Fleece sent a landing party ashore at Chinstrap Point.

The name "Vindication Island" refers to the fact that initially, James Cook's report of there being two islands (rather than one or three) was not believed. Knob Point was charted in 1930 by Discovery Investigations personnel on Discovery II, and probably so named because a conspicuous height of land overlooks the point.

== Geography ==
Vindication Island is one of the South Sandwich Islands, a 320 kilometres (200 mi) long north–south trending island arc to the southeast of South Georgia and the Falklands. They include Zavodovski, Leskov Island, Visokoi, Candlemas Island-Vindication Island, Saunders Island, Montagu Island, Bristol Island and Freezland Rock, Bellingshausen Island, Cook Island and Thule Island. All the islands are small and volcanic, most showing evidence of activity during the last two centuries. They are subject to intense marine erosion. Submarine volcanoes include Protector Shoals at the northern end and Nelson and Kemp seamounts at the southern end of the island chain. Politically, the South Sandwich Islands are part of the British Overseas Territory of South Georgia and the South Sandwich Islands. Vindication Island is among the most visited South Sandwich Islands, and once one has overcome the coastal cliffs, traversing the interior is relatively easy.

Vindication Island is rectangular, with a 2.1 kilometres (1.3 mi) long side and a 1.6 kilometres (0.99 mi) short side. The corners of the rectangle are the northwestern Crosscut Point cape, the northeastern Braces Point, the southeastern Chinstrap Point and the southwestern Knob Point. The entire coastline is made up by steep cliffs that rise above bouldery beaches; the only exception is the valley where Pothole Gulch enters the sea. Offshore lie numerous islets, such as Castor Rock and Pollux Rock south/southwest of Chinstrap Point and an unnamed islet west of Crosscut Point.

The island's highest point is Quadrant Peak at 442 m (1,450 ft), and lies in the southwestern corner of the island above Knob Point, dropping almost directly into the sea. A subsidiary peak above Crosscut Point is Splinter Crag, which rises 175 metres (574 ft) above sea level. From there, the island slopes downwards in eastern direction. This asymmetric shape is due to erosion by weather and sea being concentrated on the western side of the island. The inland is formed by tablelands, ridges and creeks, its surface covered with blocky debris from which lavas and pyroclastics emerge.

The island is mostly ice-free save for a shrinking area above 250 metres (820 ft) around Quadrant Peak; in 1964 ice covered about 0.3 square kilometres (0.12 sq mi). Only about one tenth of the island is ice-covered, because the small size of the island limits the area on which snow and ice can accumulate. Separate ice bodies are found on the eastern side, where the main ice cap has left moraines. There are three major drainages that all emanate from Quadrant Peak: An unnamed one going northeast, Leafvein Gulch that runs eastward and Pothole Gulch to the southeast. Leafvein Gulch during summer forms a waterfall across the coastal cliffs. Pothole Gulch is fed by meltwater from the small ice cap. The shape of the unnamed drainage implies that it once extended farther west, before coastal erosion truncated it.

=== Submarine structure ===
Vindication Island lies about 4.5 kilometres (2.8 mi) west of Candlemas Island. The Nelson Channel between the two islands is only about 24 metres (79 ft) deep. Both Candlemas and Vindication rise from the same submarine volcano, and are named the Candlemas Islands. Around the islands the sea is less than 100 metres (330 ft) deep, forming a 12 kilometres (7.5 mi) wide shallow platform with numerous shoals, islets and sea stacks. They are remnants of eroded islands and include Buddha Rock, Castor Rock, Cook Rock, Pollux Rock, Santa Rock, Saw Rock, Tomblin Rock and Trousers Rock. Most of the islets lie around Vindication. Some of these rocks make up a series of shoals between the islands. The shelf itself probably formed through marine erosion and scouring by icebergs.

The volcano has a base diameter of more than 53 kilometres (33 mi) at 2,500 metres (8,200 ft) and a total volume of about 2,200 cubic kilometres (530 cu mi). Away from the shallow platform, the slopes of the volcano drop off steeply into the deep ocean. East of Candlemas and abutting its southeastern side is a large 16 kilometres (9.9 mi) wide submarine embayment, probably the remnant of a large sector collapse. Two other structures interpreted as landslide scars lie north and south of the shelf, which is scalloped by landslide scars. The submarine slopes have wave-like bedforms in many places. Smaller ridges emanate from the submarine volcano and are interpreted as parts of it, while chutes emanating in all directions formed through mass wasting. A submarine ridge at 1 kilometre (0.62 mi) depth connects the group to Visokoi farther north. West of Candlemas, monogenetic volcanoes are developed on the seafloor.

== Geology ==
East of the South Sandwich Islands, the South America Plate subducts beneath the Scotia Plate at a rate of 70 millimetres per year (2.8 in/year). The subduction is responsible for the existence of the South Sandwich island arc, which is constituted by about eleven islands in an eastward curving chain, and submarine volcanoes such as Protector in the north and Adventure and Kemp in the south. Most of the islands are stratovolcanoes of various sizes. Geologically, Vindication Island resembles the older southeastern part of Candlemas Island.

=== Composition ===
Basalt and basaltic andesite make up Vindication Island. Andesite, gabbro and palagonite have been reported as well; the gabbro may be a xenolith. Phenocrysts include olivine, plagioclase and pyroxene. The rocks of Vindication Island and the older series on Candlemas Island define a potassium-poor tholeiitic suite.

=== Geologic history ===
The island is made up by layers of lava flows, scoria and tuff, intruded by dykes. The tuffs have red, yellow and brown colours. Some surfaces are formed by volcanic ash, while lava flows make up the islets. The oldest rocks are presumably found at the bottom of the cliffs, while lava flows at the surface are probably the youngest rocks. Coastal erosion has removed most of the volcanic pile, so that only about one-fifth of the original volcano remains. The island was probably formed by three separate volcanic centres, two of which were centered offshore of the current island and are now completely eroded.

The island is probably younger than one million years and activity may have continued into the Holocene. No historical activity is known from Vindication Island. There is no evidence of recent activity nor of any recently active fumaroles.

== Climate and vegetation ==
Vindication Island has a well-developed vegetation, consisting of algae (Note: Prasiola is the most important alga on the island.), lichens (Note: Lichen species identified on Vindication are Acarospora sp., Buellia anisomera, Buellia coniops, Buellia russa, Lecania brialmontii, Lecanora polytropa, Lecanora sp, Lecidea sp., Mastodia tesselata, Microglaena antarctica, Pertusaria sp., Psoroma hypnorum, Psoroma sp. and Usnea antarctica.) and mosses (Note: Moss species are Andreaea gainii, Brachythecium sp., Bryum sp., Ceratodon sp., Dicranoweisia grimmiaceae, Drepanocladus cf. uncinatus, Hennediella antarctica, Hymenoloma antarcticum, Polytrichum alpinum, Pottia austrogeogica and Syntrichia filaris.). Soils on the island are less permeable than on other islands in the archipelago, allowing more water retention and thus facilitating vegetation growth. The vegetation forms distinct plant communities, with mats and tall turfs. Mites (Note: Mite species include Alaskozetes antarcticus, Ayersacarus tilbrooki, Eupodes minutus, Halozetes belgicae, Heterogamasus calcarellus, Litogamasus gressitti, Nanorchestes nivalis and Pilellus rykei.) and springtails (Note: Springtail species include Archisotoma brucei and Cryptopygus antarcticus) inhabit the vegetation.

Numerous bird species breed on Vindication Island, including Antarctic fulmars, cape petrels, chinstrap penguins, macaroni penguins, snow petrels. The penguins are concentrated on Chinstrap Point, where in 1964 60,000-100,000 breeding pairs were observed, while the seabirds nest in cliffs. A survey in 2011 showed that the penguin populations were either stable or increasing. Other animals that visit Vindication Island include Antarctic fur seals, brown skuas, Dominican gulls, elephant seals, leopard seals, shags, Weddel seals and Wilson's petrels.

== See also ==
- List of Antarctic and subantarctic islands
