= Mount Augustus National Park =

National park in Western Australia

- IUCN category III (natural monument or feature)
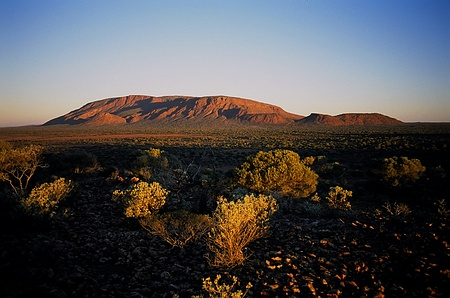
- Mount Augustus

- Location within Western Australia
- Location: Western Australia
- Nearest city: Meekatharra
- Coordinates: 24°19′50″S 116°50′37″E
- Area: 91.68 km^{2} (35.40 sq mi)
- Established: 1989
- Governing body: Department of Parks and Wildlife (Western Australia) (was Department of Environment and Conservation)
- Website: Official website

Mount Augustus National Park is located 852 km north of Perth, 490 km by road east of Carnarvon and 390 km northwest of Meekatharra, in the Gascoyne region of Western Australia. Mount Augustus itself, the feature around which the national park is based, is known as Burringurrah to the local Wadjari Aboriginal people.

== Mount Augustus ==
Mount Augustus is an inselberg or monocline, not a monolith as often stated in tourist literature.

There is a caravan park at nearby Mount Augustus Station homestead, which also has "Donga" style accommodation and a restaurant which is open in peak tourist season.

== Geology ==
Mount Augustus is composed of sandstone and conglomerate, a formation known to geologists as the Mount Augustus Sandstone, which overlies older granite near its northern end. The Mount Augustus Sandstone was deposited by ancient river systems and is somewhat younger than the 1.64 billion year old granite beneath. The originally horizontal sediments have been folded into an asymmetric anticline by later tectonic movements.

== European history ==
Francis Thomas Gregory reached the summit on 3 June 1858 during his 107-day journey through the Gascoyne region, becoming the first recorded European to climb the mountain. Some weeks later he named the peak after his brother, Sir Augustus Charles Gregory (1819–1905). At the time Augustus was on his last expedition, an unsuccessful foray into western Queensland in an attempt to discover the whereabouts of Ludwig Leichhardt.

The pastoral lease, Mount Augustus Station, which once included Mount Augustus was settled in 1887. A portion of this lease along with a portion of the Cobra Station lease, totalling 9,168 hectares (22,655 acres) were voluntarily released in 1989 to create the National Park.

== See also ==
- Protected areas of Western Australia
