= Lasioglossum hiltacum =

Scientific classification
- Kingdom: Animalia
- Phylum: Arthropoda
- Clade: Pancrustacea
- Class: Insecta
- Order: Hymenoptera
- Family: Halictidae
- Genus: Lasioglossum
- Species: L. hiltacum

Binomial name
- Lasioglossum hiltacum Smith, 1853

Synonyms
- Parasphecodes hiltacus Smith, 1853; Parasphecodes frenchi Cockerell, 1904; Parasphecodes schomburgki Cockerell, 1910; Parasphecodes sextus Cockerell, 1910; Parasphecodes vulneratus Cockerell, 1910; Parasphecodes speculiferus Cockerell, 1912; Parasphecodes vermiculatus Cockerell, 1914; Parasphecodes solis Cockerell, 1922

Species of bee

Lasioglossum hiltacum, or Lasioglossum (Parasphecodes) hiltacum, is a species of bee in the family Halictidae and subfamily Halictinae. It is endemic to Australia. It was described by English entomologist Frederick Smith in 1853.

== Distribution and habitat ==
The species occurs across much of southern Australia. Type localities include Melbourne in Victoria, Brisbane in south-east Queensland and Adelaide in South Australia.

== Behaviour ==
The adults are flying mellivores. Flowering plants visited by the bees include Helichrysum, Olearia, Senecio, Nerium, Diplotaxis, Bauera, Leucopogon, Acacia, Jacksonia, Pultenaea, Senna, Scaevola, Glischrocaryon, Angophora, Callistemon, Eucalyptus, Leptospermum, Melaleuca, Syncarpia, Tristaniopsis, Eriochilus, Bursaria, Hakea, Alphitonia, Cotoneaster, Asterolasia, Boronia, Myoporum, Solanum and Xanthorrhoea species.
