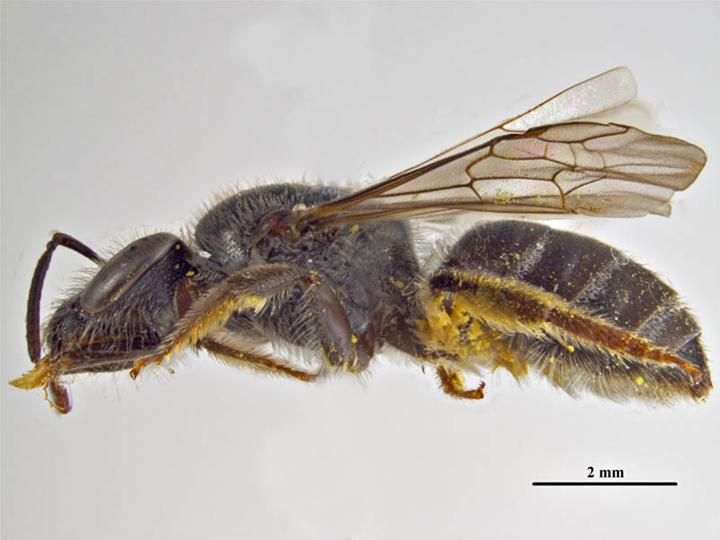
- Female
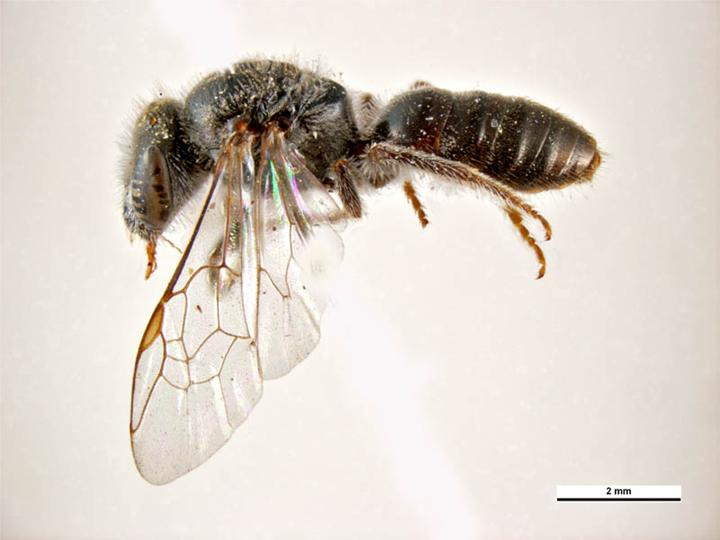
- Male

Scientific classification
- Kingdom: Animalia
- Phylum: Arthropoda
- Clade: Pancrustacea
- Class: Insecta
- Order: Hymenoptera
- Family: Halictidae
- Genus: Lasioglossum
- Species: L. instabilis

Binomial name
- Lasioglossum instabilis (Cockerell, 1914)

Synonyms
- Halictus instabilis Cockerell, 1914; Halictus elliottii Rayment, 1929

= Lasioglossum instabilis =

Species of bee

Lasioglossum instabilis, or Lasioglossum (Chilalictus) instabilis, is a species of bee in the family Halictidae and subfamily Halictinae. It is endemic to Australia. It was described by British-American entomologist Theodore Dru Alison Cockerell in 1914.

== Description ==
Female body length is about 8 mm. Integumental colouration is mainly black; the hair is grey.

== Distribution and habitat ==
The species occurs across southern and eastern mainland Australia. Type localities include Croydon and Cann River in Victoria.

== Behaviour ==
The adults are flying mellivores. Flowering plants visited by the bees include Acacia, Bauera, Bursaria, Calytrix, Conospermum, Eucalyptus, Glischrocaryon, Goodenia, Grevillea, Hakea, Helichrysum, Hibbertia, Kunzea, Leptospermum, Leucopogon, Lomatia, Melaleuca, Persoonia, Thelymitra, Verticordia and Xanthorrhoea species.
