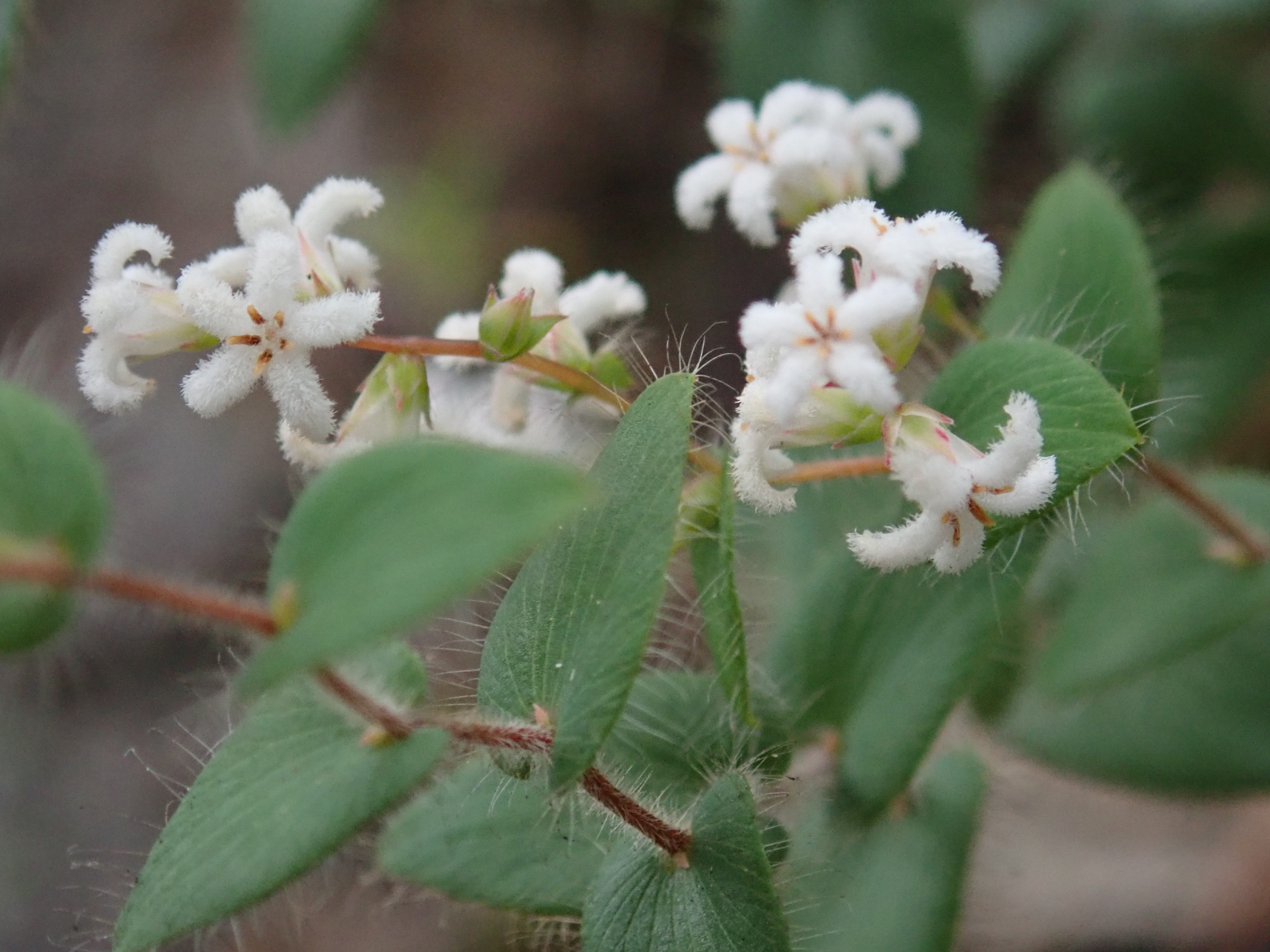
- In Ku-ring-gai Chase National Park

Scientific classification
- Kingdom: Plantae
- Clade: Tracheophytes
- Clade: Angiosperms
- Clade: Eudicots
- Clade: Asterids
- Order: Ericales
- Family: Ericaceae
- Genus: Leucopogon
- Species: L. amplexicaulis

Binomial name
- Leucopogon amplexicaulis (Rudge) R.Br.
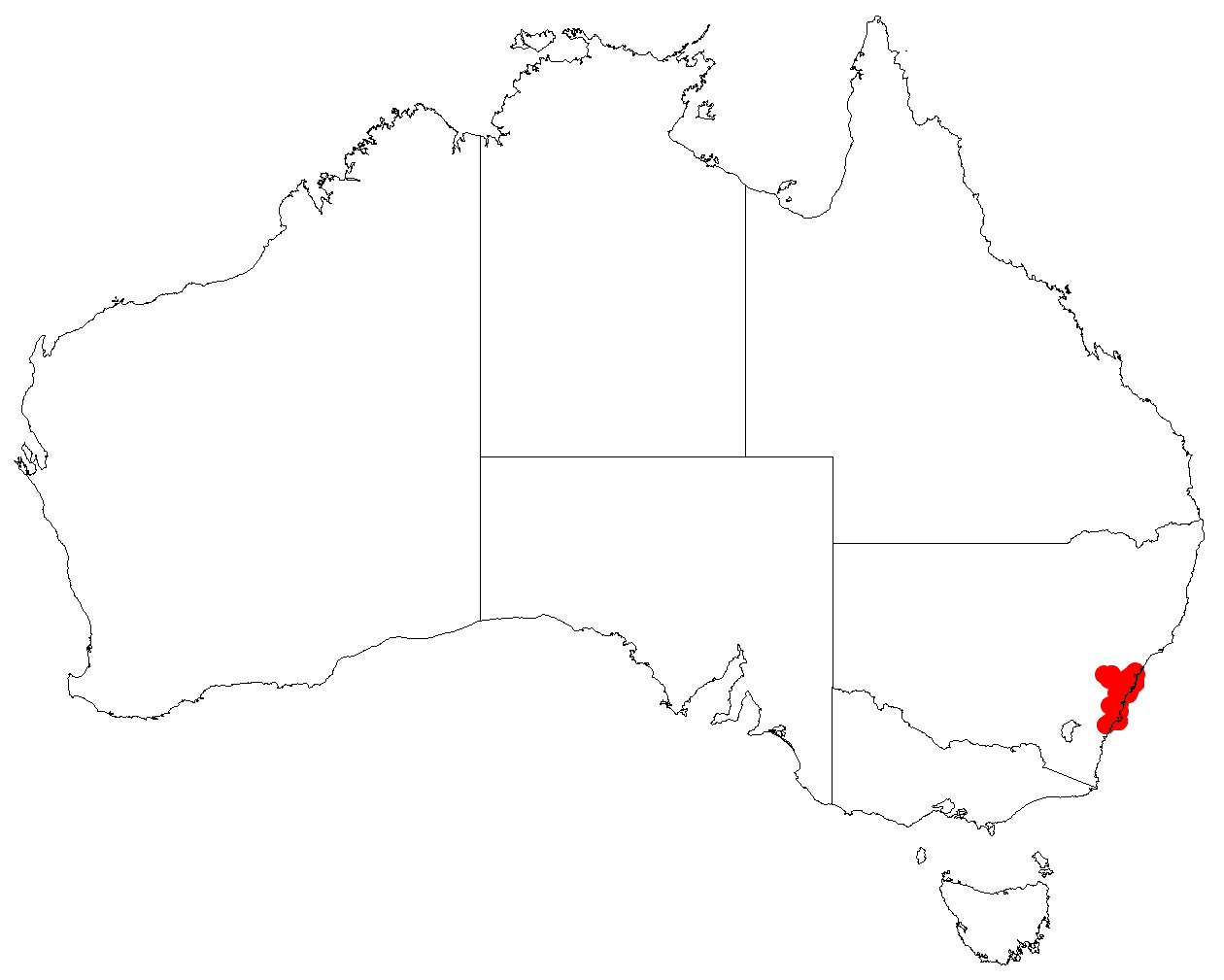
- Occurrence data from AVH

Synonyms
- Styphelia amplexicaulis Rudge

= Leucopogon amplexicaulis =

Beard-heath

Species of shrub

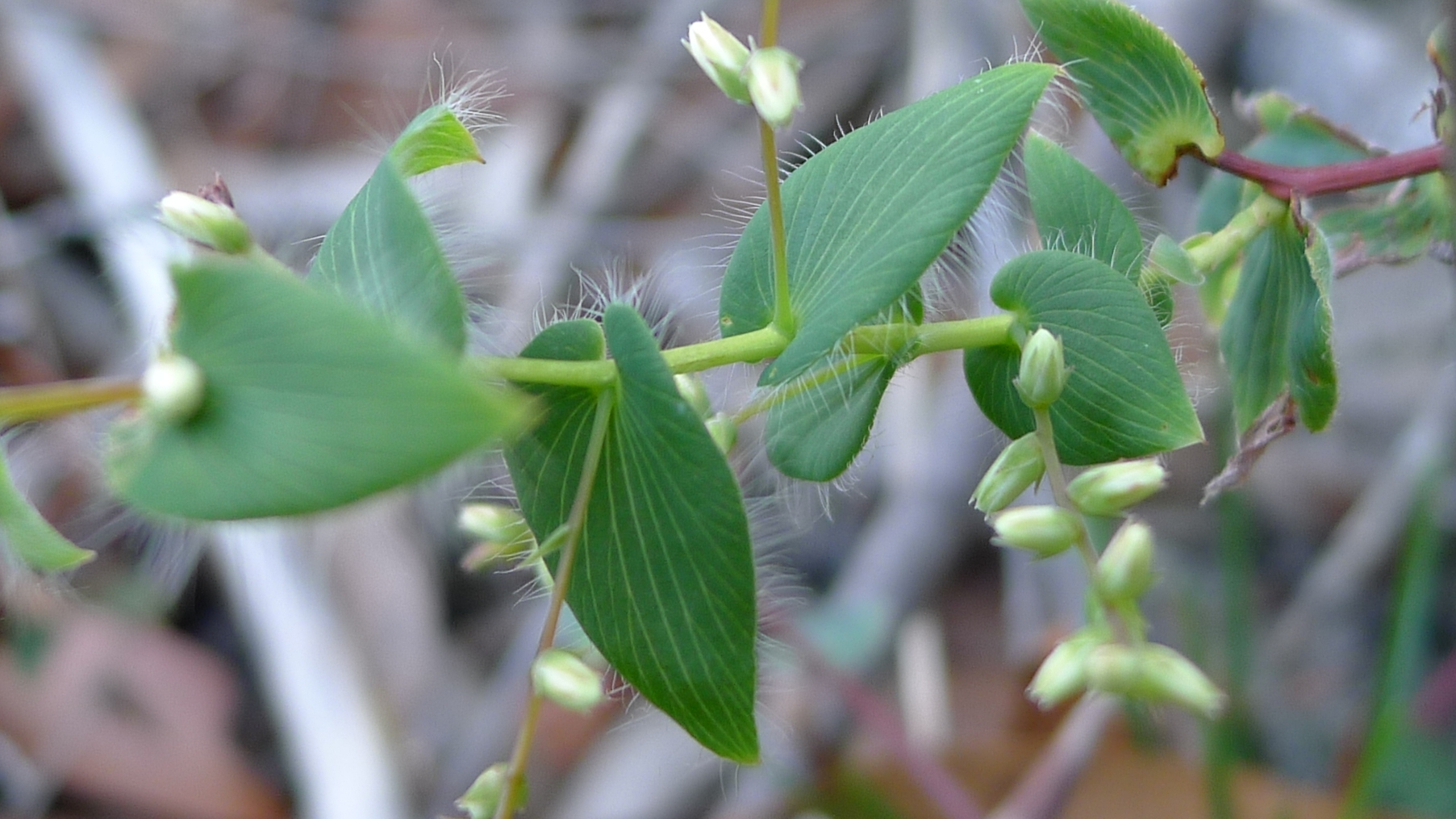
Leaf detail

Leucopogon amplexicaulis, commonly known as beard-heath, is a species of flowering plant in the heath family Ericaceae and is endemic to eastern New South Wales. It is a scrambling or straggly shrub with egg-shaped, stem-clasping leaves with hairy edges, and spikes of small white flowers.

== Description ==
Leucopogon amplexicaulis is a weak, scrambling or straggly shrub that typically grows to a height of up to 90 cm (35 in), its branchlets covered with fine hairs. The leaves are egg-shaped and stem-clasping with a heart-shaped base, 9.5–34 mm (0.37–1.34 in) long and 4.5–20 mm (0.18–0.79 in) wide on a petiole 1–2 mm (0.039–0.079 in) long. The edges of the leaf are fringed and the lower surface is covered with soft or velvety hairs. The flowers are white and arranged in groups of three to twelve along spikes up to 37 mm (1.5 in) long and longer than the leaves. The sepals are 2.1–3.1 mm (0.083–0.122 in) long with bracteoles 1.1–1.3 mm (0.043–0.051 in) long at the base. The petal tube is 1.2–1.9 mm (0.047–0.075 in) long with lobes 1.2–2.6 mm (0.047–0.102 in) long with soft hairs inside the tube. Flowering occurs from July to October and is followed by flattened, glabrous drupe about 3.5 mm (0.1 in) long.

== Taxonomy ==
Beard heath was first formally described in 1807 by Edward Rudge who gave it the name Styphelia amplexicaulis in Transactions of the Linnean Society of London from specimens collected near Port Jackson. In 1810, Robert Brown changed the name to Leucopogon amplexicaulis in his Prodromus Florae Novae Hollandiae. The species name is Latin for "stem-clasping" and refers to the leaves.

== Distribution and habitat ==
Leucopogon amplexicaulis ranges from the Sydney Basin south to Shoalhaven on the New South Wales South Coast. It is found on sandstone soils in sclerophyll forest, where it grows in sheltered locations on sandstone outcrops and platforms, often near natural seepage. In the Sydney region it is associated with trees such as Sydney peppermint (Eucalyptus piperita), red bloodwood (Corymbia gummifera) and smooth-barked apple (Angophora costata), and with shrubs such as heath banksia (Banksia ericifolia), coral fern (Gleichenia dicarpa) and dog rose (Bauera rubioides).

== Ecology ==
Plants live between twenty and thirty years, and become more common in areas long unburnt by bushfire. Leucopogon amplexicaulis is killed by fire and regenerates by seed. The seeds are thought to possibly be dispersed by ants. Beard-heath is killed by fire and regenerates by seed.

== Use in horticulture ==
Members of the genus Leucopogon are seldom cultivated, as their propagation by seed or cutting can be difficult. L. amplexicaulis requires a well-drained site with ample moisture and dappled shade in a garden situation. They can be grown in humus-enriched and well-drained soil. They best grown in full sun, which keeps the growth compact, and may benefit from light trimming. If they are propagated from seed, they mostly need scarification or prolonged soaking, of from layers or half-hardened tip cuttings. For growing in gardens, they must have a well-drained site with ample moisture and dappled shade with a cool root run provided by large stones. It is mainly used for ornamental purposes in home gardens and public parks. They are also displayed at botanical gardens for educational purposes. It also has decorative value and can be used to make bouquets.
