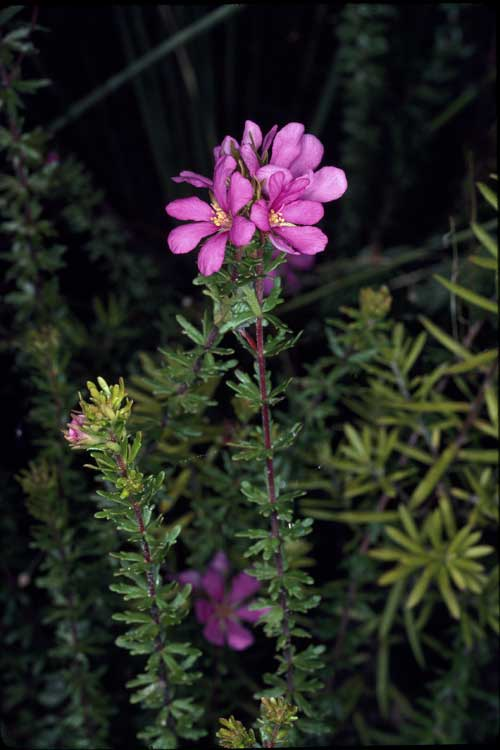
- In Coffs Harbour

Scientific classification
- Kingdom: Plantae
- Clade: Tracheophytes
- Clade: Angiosperms
- Clade: Eudicots
- Clade: Rosids
- Order: Oxalidales
- Family: Cunoniaceae
- Genus: Bauera
- Species: B. capitata

Binomial name
- Bauera capitata Ser. ex DC.

Synonyms
- Bauera capitata var. alba Guilf.; Bauera capitata Ser. ex DC. var. capitata

= Bauera capitata =

Species of flowering plant

Bauera capitata is a species of flowering plant in the family Cunoniaceae and is endemic to coastal eastern Australia. It is a small shrub with trifoliate, usually lobed leaves and sessile, deep pink flowers with twelve to fifteen stamens.

== Description ==
Bauera capitata is a shrub that typically grows to a height of 30 cm (12 in) and has a few spreading branches. The leaves are trifoliate, 3–7 mm (0.12–0.28 in) long, 1–2 mm (0.039–0.079 in) wide and usually have lobed edges. The flowers are arranged in groups at the ends of the branches and are more or less sessile with four sepals 3–4 mm (0.12–0.16 in) long, four deep pink petals 7–8 mm (0.28–0.31 in) long, and twelve to fifteen pink stamens. Flowering occurs in September and October.

== Taxonomy ==
Bauera capitata was first formally described in 1830 by Augustin Pyramus de Candolle in his Prodromus Systematis Naturalis Regni Vegetabilis, from an unpublished description by Nicolas Charles Seringe. The specific epithet (capitata) means "having flowers in heads".

== Distribution and habitat ==
This species of Bauera grows in near-coastal areas from south-eastern Queensland to Port Hacking in New South Wales.
