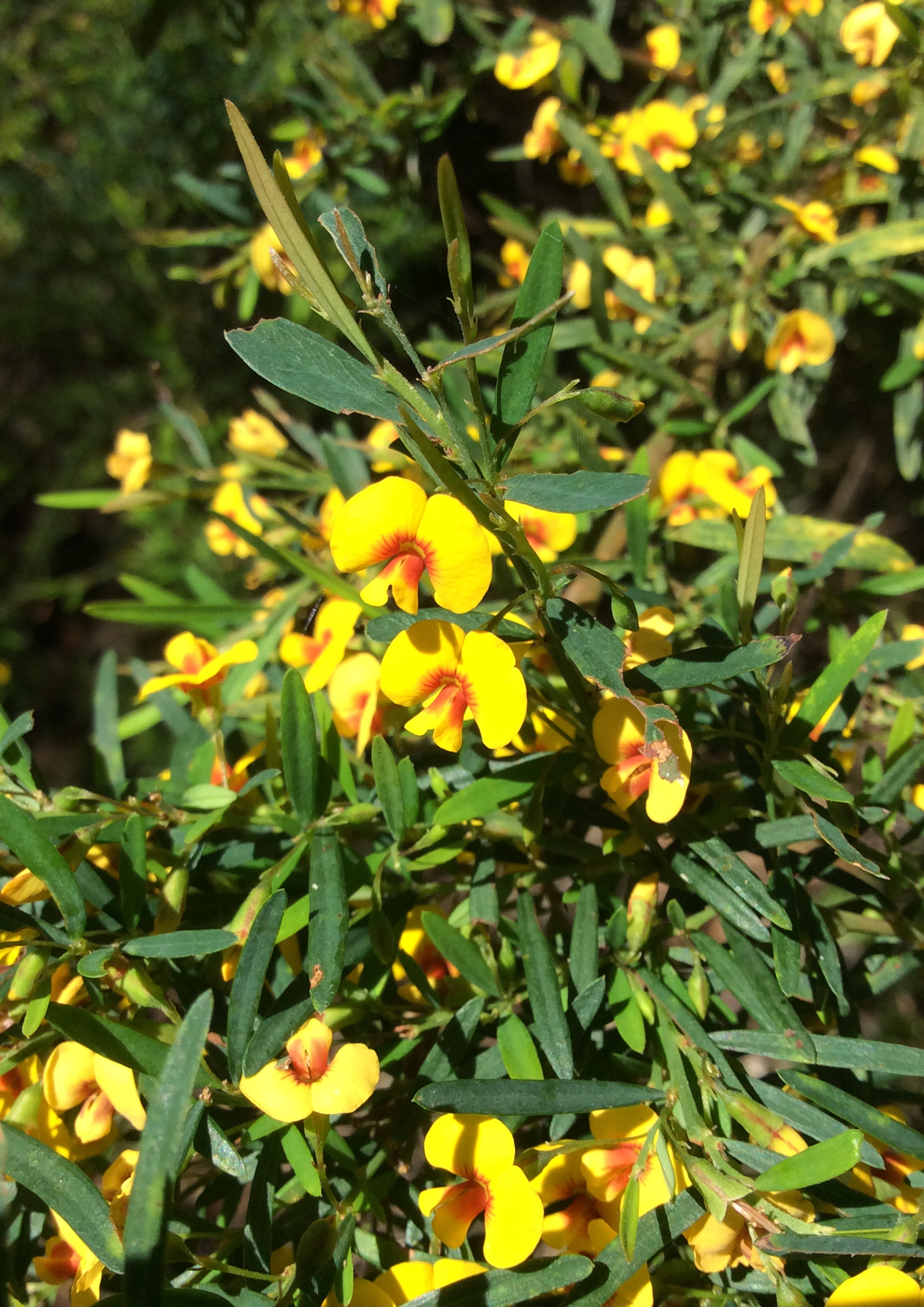
- Near Manjimup

Scientific classification
- Kingdom: Plantae
- Clade: Tracheophytes
- Clade: Angiosperms
- Clade: Eudicots
- Clade: Rosids
- Order: Fabales
- Family: Fabaceae
- Subfamily: Faboideae
- Genus: Bossiaea
- Species: B. linophylla

Binomial name
- Bossiaea linophylla R.Br.
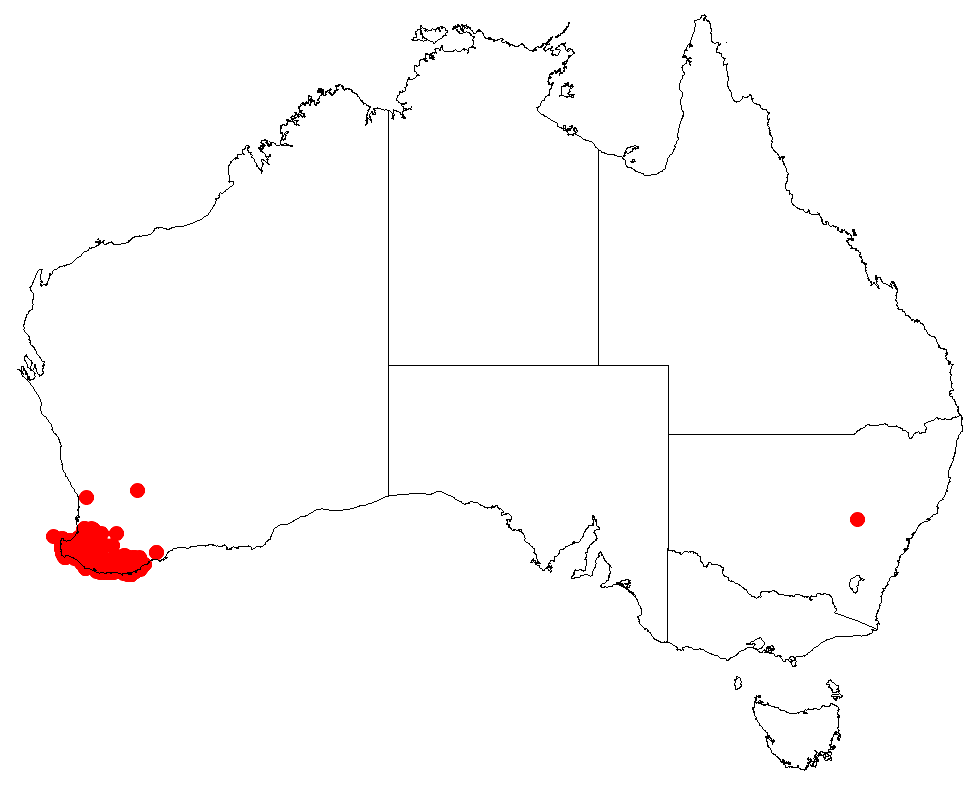
- Range map generated from data at Australasian Virtual Herbarium

= Bossiaea linophylla =

Species of legume

Bossiaea linophylla is a species of flowering plant in the family Fabaceae and is endemic to the south-west of Western Australia. It is a spreading shrub with linear to oblong or egg-shaped leaves, and bright yellow to orange or apricot-coloured and red flowers.

== Description ==
Bossiaea linophylla is a spreading shrub, usually with a weeping habit, that typically grows up to a height of up to 3 m (9.8 ft) and has branchlets that are flattened to oval in cross-section. The leaves are linear to oblong or egg-shaped, 13–30 mm (0.51–1.18 in) long and 0.9–2 mm (0.035–0.079 in) wide on a petiole up to 1 mm (0.039 in) long with tapering stipules 0.7–2.2 mm (0.028–0.087 in) long at the base. The flowers are arranged singly or in small groups, each flower on a thread-like pedicel 0.5–1.4 mm (0.020–0.055 in) long with linear bracteoles 0.7–2.2 mm (0.028–0.087 in) long on the pedicel. There is a single egg-shaped bract up to 0.5–1 mm (0.020–0.039 in) long but that falls off at the early bud stage. The five sepals are joined at the base forming a tube 2.0–3.2 mm (0.079–0.126 in) long, the two upper lobes 1.0–1.5 mm (0.039–0.059 in) long, and the lower lobes slightly shorter. The standard petal is bright yellow to orange or apricot with a red base and 6.6–9.7 mm (0.26–0.38 in) long, the wings 6.4–8.3 mm (0.25–0.33 in) long, and the keel red, sometimes with a greenish base and 4.8–6.4 mm (0.19–0.25 in) long. Flowering occurs from July to December.

== Taxonomy and naming ==
Bossiaea linophylla was first formally described in 1812 by Robert Brown in William Aiton's Hortus Kewensis. The specific epithet (linophylla) means "thread-leaved".

== Distribution and habitat ==
This bossiaea is found between Collie, Augusta, Albany and the Stirling Range in the Avon Wheatbelt, Esperance Plains, Jarrah Forest, Swan Coastal Plain and Warren biogeographic regions where it grows in forest, woodland and heath and is often the dominant understorey species.

== Conservation status ==
Bossiaea linophylla is classified as "not threatened" by the Western Australian Government Department of Parks and Wildlife.

== Ecology ==
The plant attracts moyadong, parrot subspecies Platycercus icterotis icterotis, which eat their fruit.
