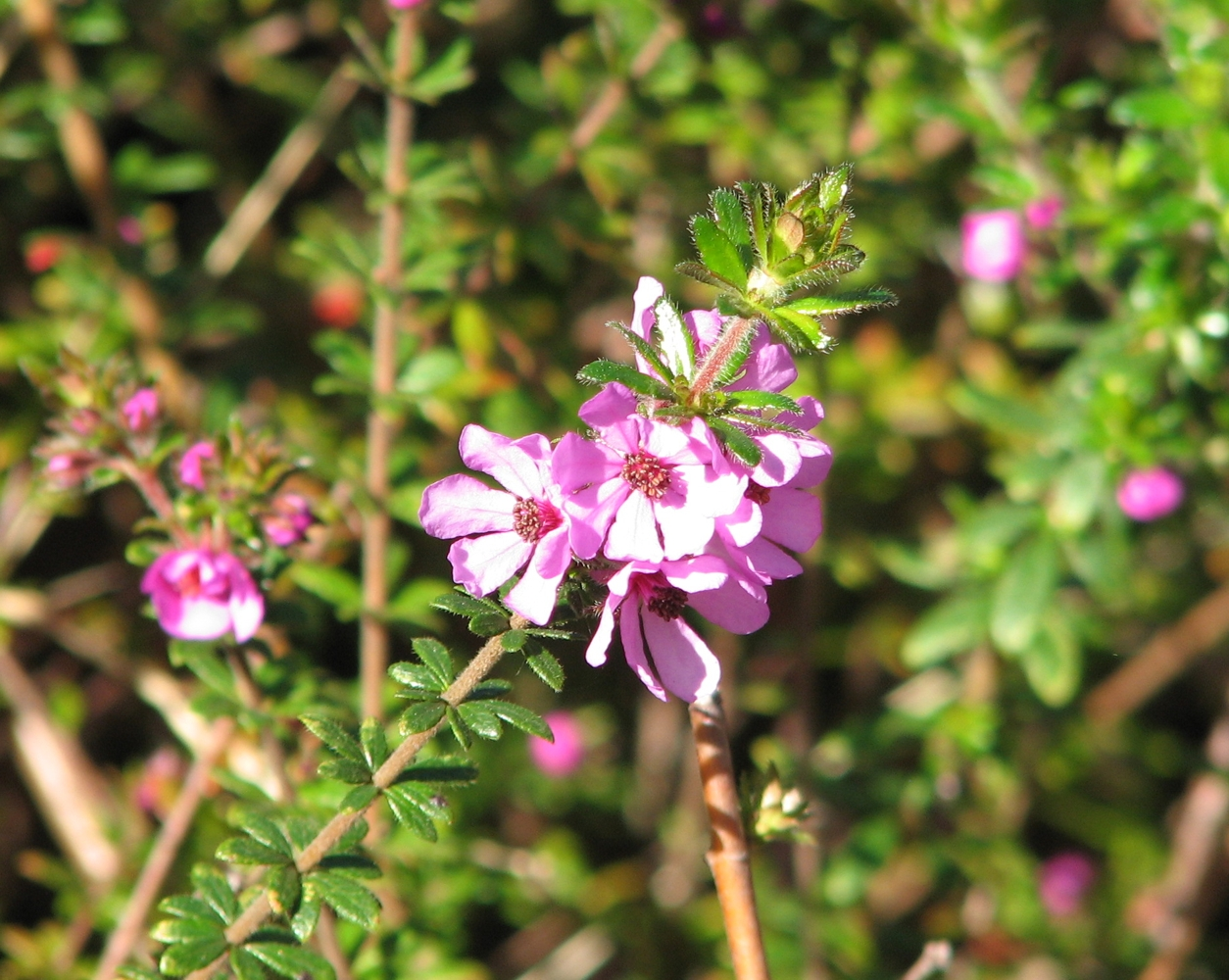
- In Maranoa Gardens

Scientific classification
- Kingdom: Plantae
- Clade: Tracheophytes
- Clade: Angiosperms
- Clade: Eudicots
- Clade: Rosids
- Order: Oxalidales
- Family: Cunoniaceae
- Genus: Bauera
- Species: B. sessiliflora

Binomial name
- Bauera sessiliflora F.Muell.

= Bauera sessiliflora =

Grampians bauera

Species of flowering plant

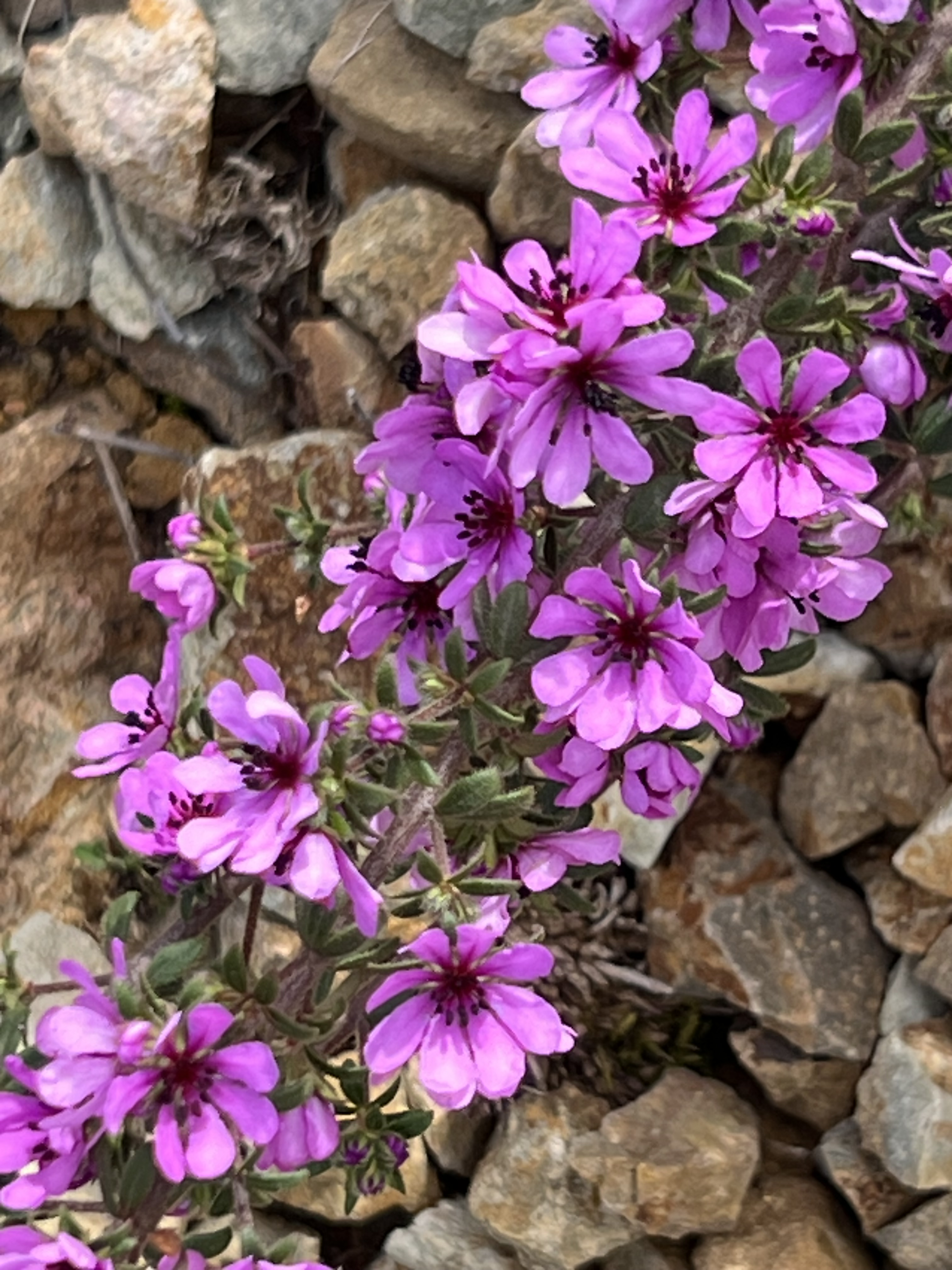

Bauera sessiliflora, also known as Grampians bauera, is a species of flowering plant in the family Cunoniaceae and is endemic to the Grampians region in Victoria, Australia. It is a scrambling shrub with wiry branches, trifoliate leaves and pink or magenta flowers.

== Description ==
Bauera sessiliflora is a scrambling shrub that typically grows to a height of about 2 m (6 ft 7 in) and has wiry branches. The leaves are trifoliate, the leaflets narrowly elliptic to egg-shaped with the narrower end towards the base, mostly 4–15 mm (0.16–0.59 in) long, 2–5 mm (0.079–0.197 in) wide. The flowers are borne in leaf axils and are about 10–15 mm (0.39–0.59 in) wide and sessile. There are six or eight narrowly triangular sepals 2–3 mm (0.079–0.118 in) long, a similar number of rosy-pink or magenta petals 6–8 mm (0.24–0.31 in) long, and about twice as many dark purple stamens. Flowering mostly occurs from September to December.

== Taxonomy ==
Bauera sessiliflora was first formally described in 1855 by Victorian Government Botanist Ferdinand von Mueller in his book Definitions of rare or hitherto undescribed Australian plants, based on plant material collected at Mount William in the Grampians National Park.

== Distribution and habitat ==
Grampians bauera is endemic to the Grampians where it grows in damp locations near streams and rocky gullies.

== Use in horticulture ==
Bauera sessiliflora is not common in gardens, but can be grown in moist, well-drained soil.
