= Leucopogon obovatus =

Scientific classification
- Kingdom: Plantae
- Clade: Tracheophytes
- Clade: Angiosperms
- Clade: Eudicots
- Clade: Asterids
- Order: Ericales
- Family: Ericaceae
- Genus: Leucopogon
- Species: L. obovatus

Binomial name
- Leucopogon obovatus (Labill.) R.Br.
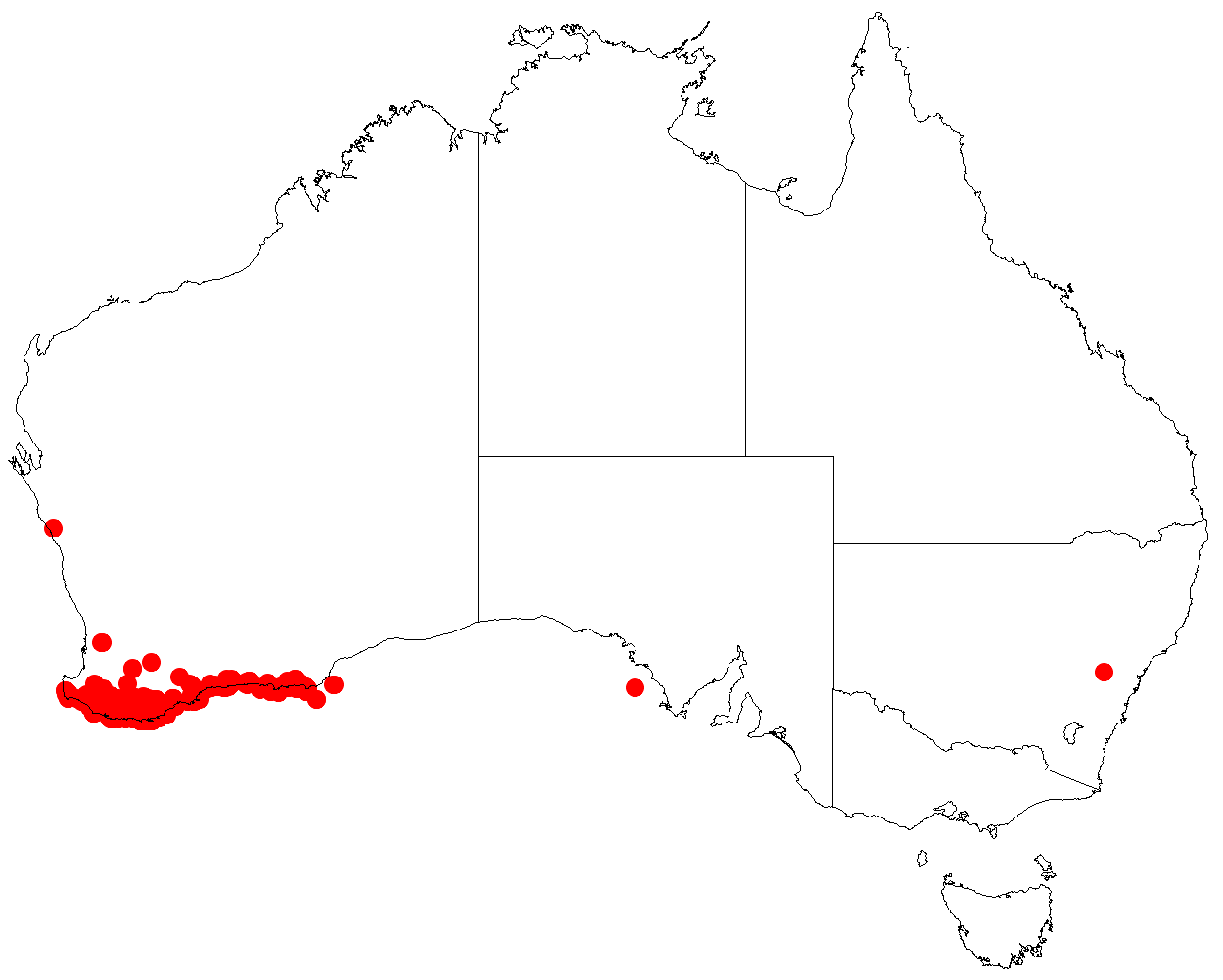
- Occurrence data from AVH

Synonyms
- Styphelia obovata Labill.; Styphelia obovata Labill. var. obovata

Species of plant

Leucopogon obovatus is a species of flowering plant in the heath family Ericaceae and is endemic to the southwest of Western Australia. It is an erect shrub with hairy young branchlets, variably-shaped, simple leaves, and erect clusters of 3 to 15 white, bell-shaped flowers on the ends of branches and in upper leaf axils.

== Description ==
Leucopogon obovatus is an erect, robust shrub that typically grows up to about 2.5 m (8 ft 2 in) high and 2 m (6 ft 7 in) wide with many stems at its base, its young branchlets mainly covered with straight or slightly curved hairs. The leaves are spirally arranged, variably shaped from egg-shaped to narrowly egg-shaped, narrowly elliptic or linear, 6–23 mm (0.24–0.91 in) long and 0.6–4.5 mm (0.024–0.177 in) wide on a greenish-yellow to pale brown petiole 0.2–0.6 mm (0.0079–0.0236 in) long. The upper surface of the leaves is shiny, the lower surface a paler shade of green. The flowers are arranged in groups of 3 to 15 on the ends of branchlets and in upper leaf axils, with egg-shaped to narrowly egg-shaped bracts 0.5–1.3 mm (0.020–0.051 in) long, and egg-shaped bracteoles 1.0–2.1 mm (0.039–0.083 in) long. The sepals are egg-shaped or broadly egg-shaped, 1.7–3.0 mm (0.067–0.118 in) long, and the petals white and joined at the base to form a bell-shaped tube 1.0–2.0 mm (0.039–0.079 in) long, the lobes 2.2–3.5 mm (0.087–0.138 in) long, widely spreading and densely bearded inside. Flowering mainly occurs from July to October and the fruit is a broadly oval to more or less spherical drupe 1.9–2.3 mm (0.075–0.091 in) long.

== Taxonomy and naming ==
This species was first formally described in 1805 by Jacques Labillardière who gave it the name Styphelia obovata in his Novae Hollandiae Plantarum Specimen. In 1810, Robert Brown changed the name to Leucopogon obovatus in his Prodromus Florae Novae Hollandiae. The specific epithet (obovatus) means "inverted egg-shaped", referring to the leaves.

In 2011, Michael Hislop described two subspecies of L. obovatus in the journal Nuytsia and the names are accepted by the Australian Plant Census:

- Leucopogon obovatus (Labill.) R.Br. subsp. obovatus has leaves that when flattened, are egg-shaped to narrowly egg-shaped with the narrower end towards the base, or elliptic or narrowly elliptic, the lower surface usually with only short hairs, and the style 0.5–0.8 mm (0.020–0.031 in) long.
- Leucopogon obovatus subsp. revolutus (R.Br.) Hislop has leaves that when flattened, are egg-shaped to narrowly egg-shaped or narrowly elliptic, the lower surface usually with both long and short hairs, the style 0.3–0.5 mm (0.012–0.020 in) long.

== Distribution and habitat ==
Subspecies obovatus grows in heath or low woodland in near-coastal areas between West Cape Howe and Israelite Bay and subsp. revolutus is found in winter-wet heath, woodland and forest from near Margaret River to near Albany and north to near Manjimup in the Esperance Plains, Jarrah Forest and Warren bioregions of south-western Western Australia.

== Conservation status ==
Both subspecies of Leucopogon obovatus are listed as "not threatened" by the Western Australian Government Department of Biodiversity, Conservation and Attractions.

== Ecology ==
This leucopogon attracts a parrot, Platycercus icterotis icterotis, commonly known as moyadong, that eats the fruit.
