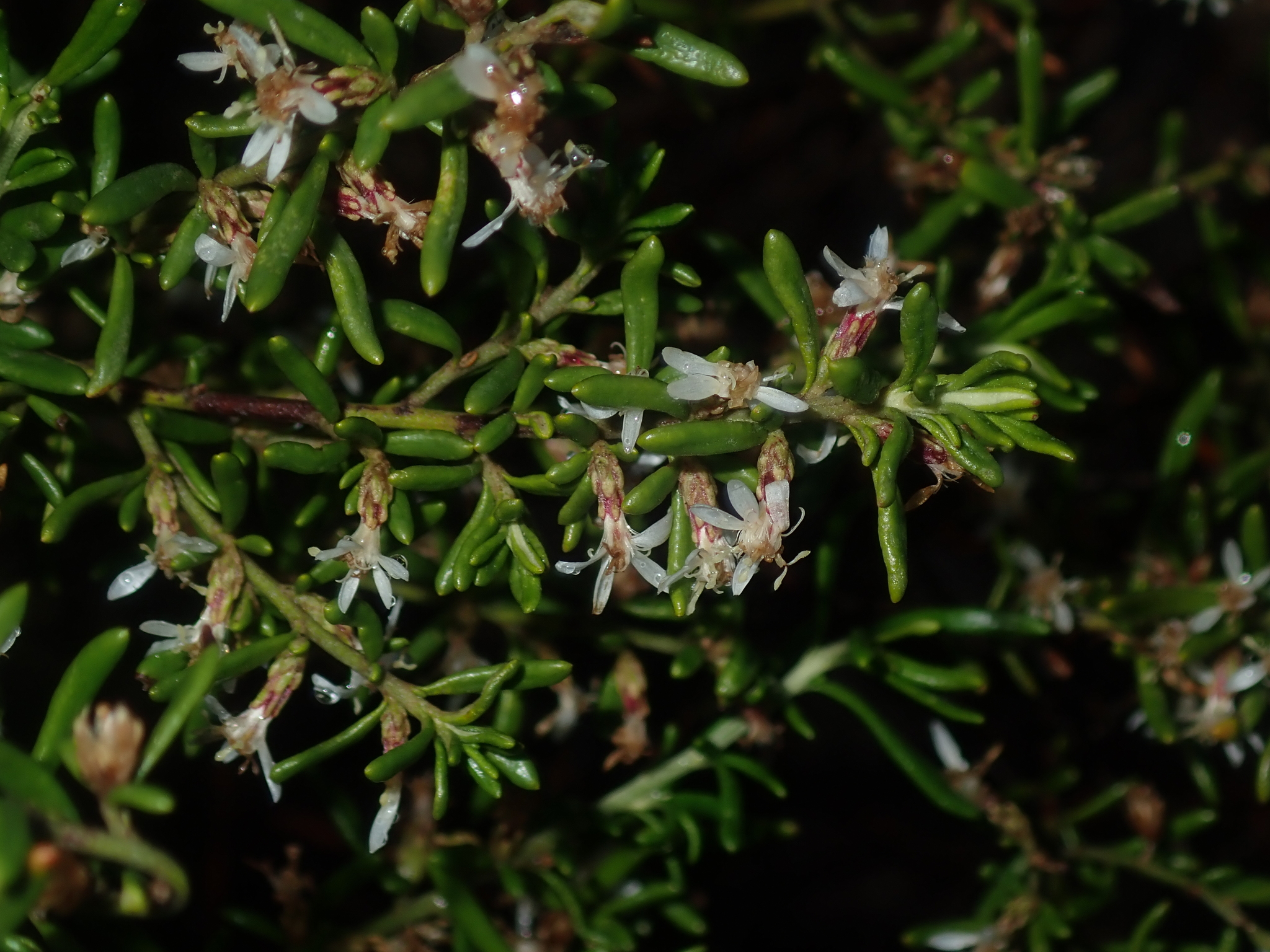

Scientific classification
- Kingdom: Plantae
- Clade: Tracheophytes
- Clade: Angiosperms
- Clade: Eudicots
- Clade: Asterids
- Order: Asterales
- Family: Asteraceae
- Genus: Olearia
- Species: O. revoluta

Binomial name
- Olearia revoluta Benth.

Synonyms
- Aster revolutus (Benth.) F.Muell.; Olearia revoluta Benth. var. revoluta

= Olearia revoluta =

Species of plant

Olearia revoluta is a species of flowering plant in the family Asteraceae and is endemic to the south-west of Western Australia. It is an erect, rounded shrub with linear to oblong leaves with the edges rolled under, and white daisy-like inflorescences.

== Description ==
Olearia revoluta is an erect, rounded shrub that typically grows to a height of 0.5–1.2 m (1 ft 8 in – 3 ft 11 in) and has many branches. The leaves are linear to oblong, 6.5–13 mm (0.26–0.51 in) long with the edges rolled under, the lower surface woolly-hairy. The heads or daisy-like "flowers" are arranged in leaf axils and are sessile or on a short peduncle with an oval to top-shaped involucre at the base. Each head has 4 to 8 white ray florets surrounding 6 to 10 disc florets. Flowering occurs between May and November.

== Taxonomy ==
Olearia revoluta was first described in 1867 by George Bentham in Flora Australiensis from specimens collected by Augustus Oldfield between the Murchison and southern Hutt Rivers. The specific epithet (revoluta) means "revolute", referring to the edges of the leaves.

== Distribution and habitat ==
This olearia grows in sand over sandstone, on the sandplains toward Geraldton and beyond Esperance in the Avon Wheatbelt, Esperance Plains, Geraldton Sandplains and Yalgoo bioregions of south-western Western Australia.

== Ecology ==
The seeds are harvested by the western rosella subspecies Platycercus icterotis icterotis.
