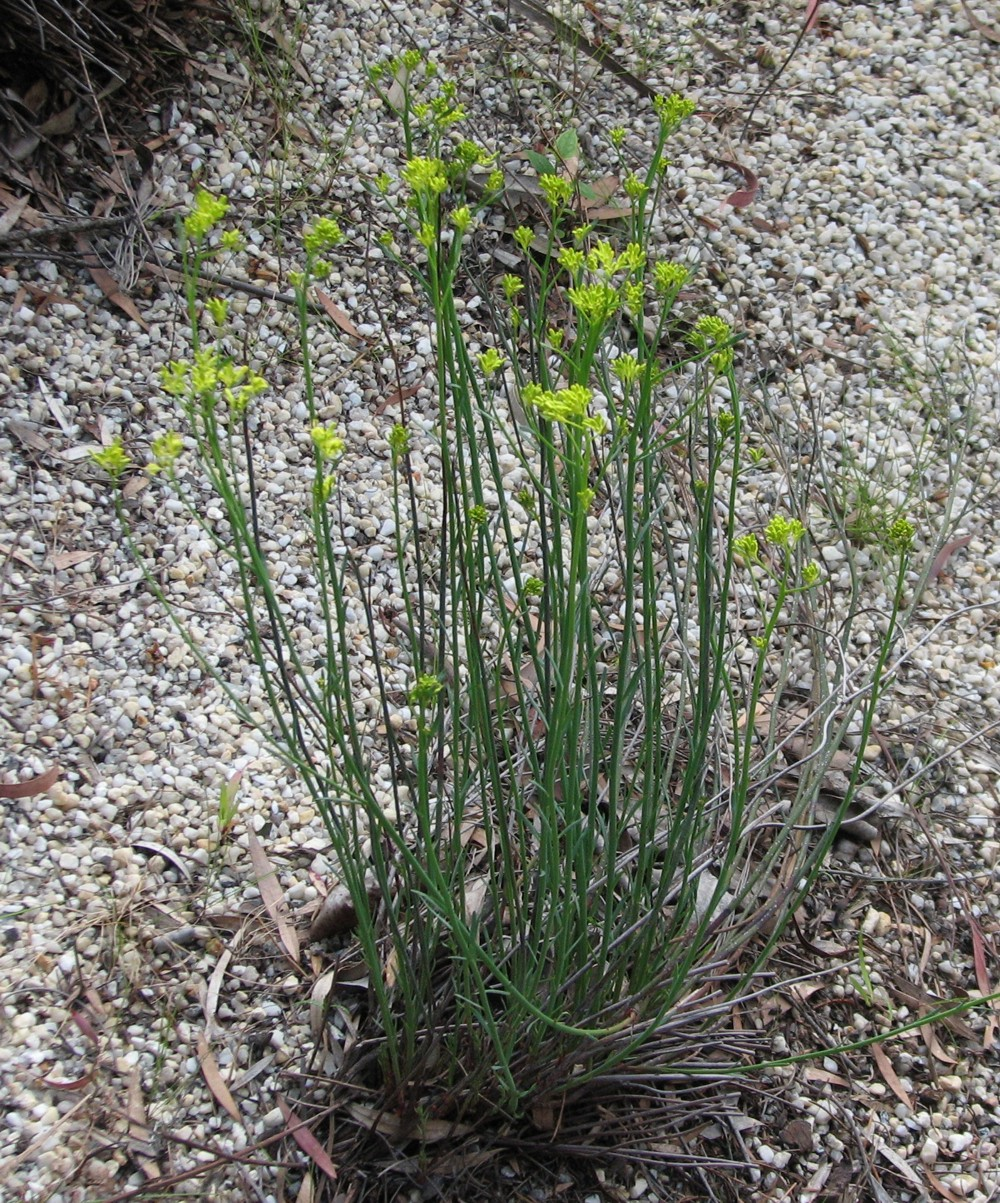

Scientific classification
- Kingdom: Plantae
- Clade: Tracheophytes
- Clade: Angiosperms
- Clade: Eudicots
- Order: Saxifragales
- Family: Haloragaceae
- Genus: Glischrocaryon
- Species: G. behrii

Binomial name
- Glischrocaryon behrii (Schltdl.) Orchard

Synonyms
- Loudonia behrii Schltdl.

= Glischrocaryon behrii =

Species of plant

Glischrocaryon behrii, or golden pennants, is a perennial herb, native to southeastern Australia. The 5 to 6 inflorescences that appear in spring each comprise 7 to 60 yellow flowers.

The species was first formally described by botanist Diederich von Schlechtendal in 1847 in Linnaea. He gave it the name Loudonia behrii. In 1970 the species was transferred to the genus Glischrocaryon.
