= Glischrocaryon flavescens =

Scientific classification
- Kingdom: Plantae
- Clade: Tracheophytes
- Clade: Angiosperms
- Clade: Eudicots
- Order: Saxifragales
- Family: Haloragaceae
- Genus: Glischrocaryon
- Species: G. flavescens

Binomial name
- Glischrocaryon flavescens (J.Drumm.) Orchard

Species of plant

Glischrocaryon flavescens is a perennial herb with woody roots that occurs in southern and western Australia.

== Taxonomy ==
The species was first described by James Drummond,

I also met with a very handsome Loudonia, which I call L. flavescens; it is a much larger plant than L. aurea (Lindl.), and throws up numerous flower-stalks to the height of five or six feet, with sulphur-coloured flowers; but the seed-vessels are almost white. It grew in a spot which appears to have been formely a lake. L. aurea scarcely produces any mature seed. L. fiavescens perfects seeds in abundance.

The current combination, Glischrocaryon flavescens, was the result of a revision by Anthony Edward Orchard in 1970, published in the journal Taxon.

== Description ==
A robust and tufted perennial herbaceous plant with creamy yellow inflorescence at long scapes that appears in February or between August and December. Grows to a height between 0.3 and 1.5 metres. Occurs in clay in sandy soil, but often stony; preferred habitat is plains and rocky hills.

== Distribution ==
The species is recorded in the plant censuses of South Australia and Western Australia, with occurrence becoming infrequent to the north and arid centre of Australia. Records in Western Australia are at the southwest and eremaean botanical provinces.

== Ecology ==
The plant attracts the parrot species, moyadong (Platycercus icterotis)
