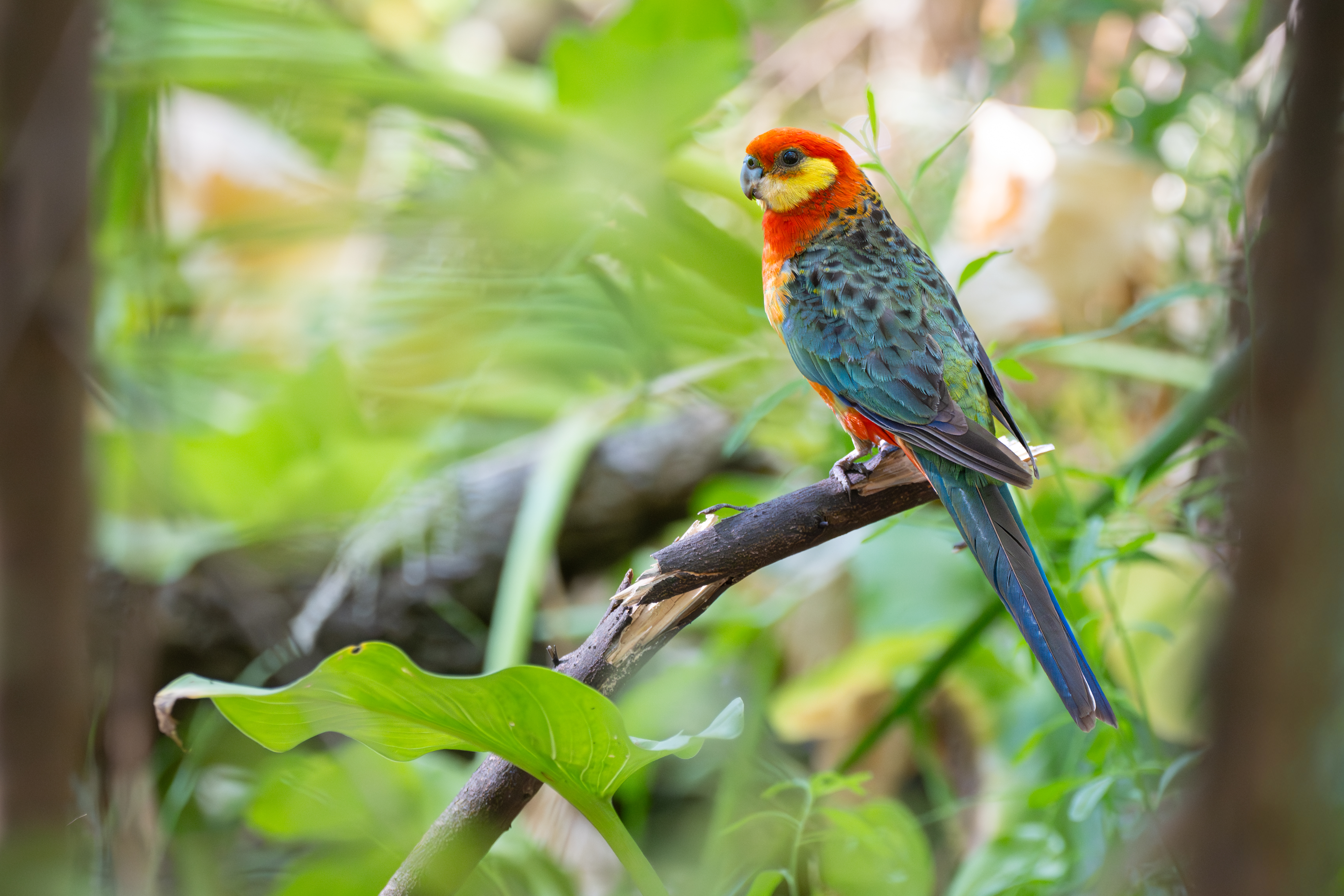
- Male
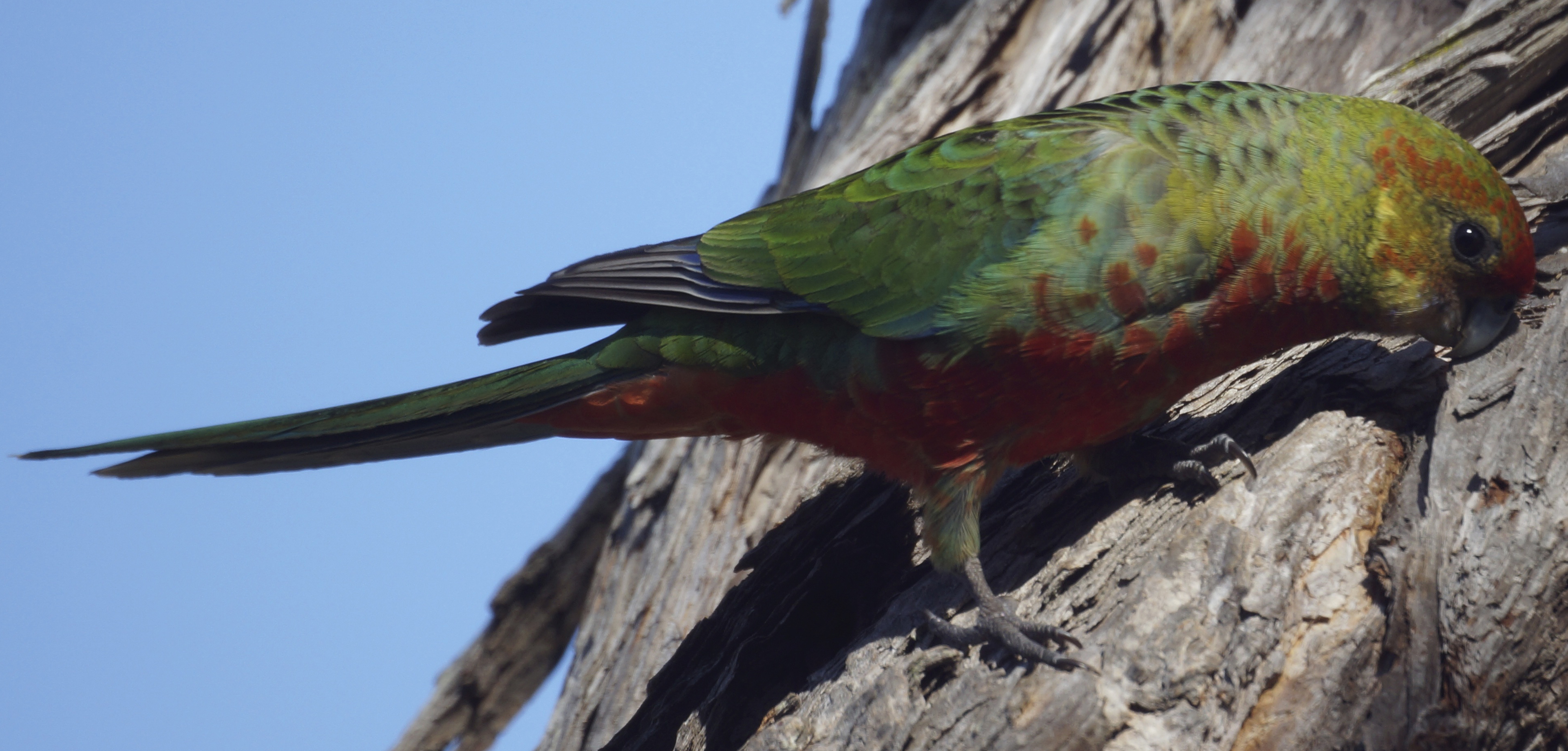
- Female

Conservation status
- Least Concern (IUCN 3.1)

Scientific classification
- Kingdom: Animalia
- Phylum: Chordata
- Class: Aves
- Order: Psittaciformes
- Family: Psittaculidae
- Genus: Platycercus
- Species: P. icterotis

Binomial name
- Platycercus icterotis (Temminck & Kuhl, 1820)

= Western rosella =

Species of bird

The western rosella (Platycercus icterotis), or moyadong, is a species of parrot endemic to southwestern Australia. The head and underparts are bright red, and the back is mottled black; a yellow patch at the cheek distinguishes it from others of the genus Platycercus. Adults of the species exhibit sexual dimorphism with the females duller overall; juveniles lack the striking colours of mature birds and the characteristic patterning is not as easily distinguished. Their communication call is a softly delivered pink-pink sound, and much of their behaviour is comparatively unobtrusive. Their habitat is in eucalypt forests and woodlands, where they often remain unobserved until they appear to feed on seeds at nearby cleared areas.

Individuals form mating pairs and generally remain in one locality, although they will venture out to join small groups at plentiful sources of food. The western rosella is predominantly herbivorous, its diet consisting mostly of seeds of grasses and other plants, although nectar and insect larvae are sometimes eaten. The damage attributed to the species at introduced fruit and grain crops saw them declared as a pest and permitted by the state to be killed or captured. They are more placid and sociable than rosellas of other Australian regions from which they are geographically isolated and have become internationally popular as an aviary bird. Their history in aviculture begins with two 1830 lithographs of live specimens in England by Edward Lear. Successful breeding in captivity began there during the early 20th century.

The population is classified as two subspecies, representing an inland group residing in the agricultural district and another nearer the coast in kwongan, tall forest and a variety of woodlands. The abrupt intersection of these groups' range, delineated by country of lower rainfall between Albany and Geraldton, is a zone of hybridisation between the two subspecies Platycercus icterotis icterotis and P. icterotis xanthogenys. The classification of the species relationship to sister taxa of Platycercus is less complex, due to their ecological and geographic isolation, and they are allied to a subgenus Platycercus (Violania) .

== Taxonomy ==
The first description of the species was published by C. J. Temminck and Heinrich Kuhl in 1820 as Psittacus icterotis, using a collection obtained at King George Sound (Albany, Western Australia). Kuhl was once mistakenly given sole authorship for the description; this was later corrected to include Temminck; Kuhl himself cited Temminck's earlier work in the text describing their three specimens. The epithet icterotis, meaning 'yellow ear', is derived from ancient Greek and presumed to refer to the yellow cheek. They were separated from the genus Psittacus in 1830 by Nicholas Vigors, to the genus Platycercus he had erected five years earlier; the specific epithet he nominated was Platycercus stanleyii.

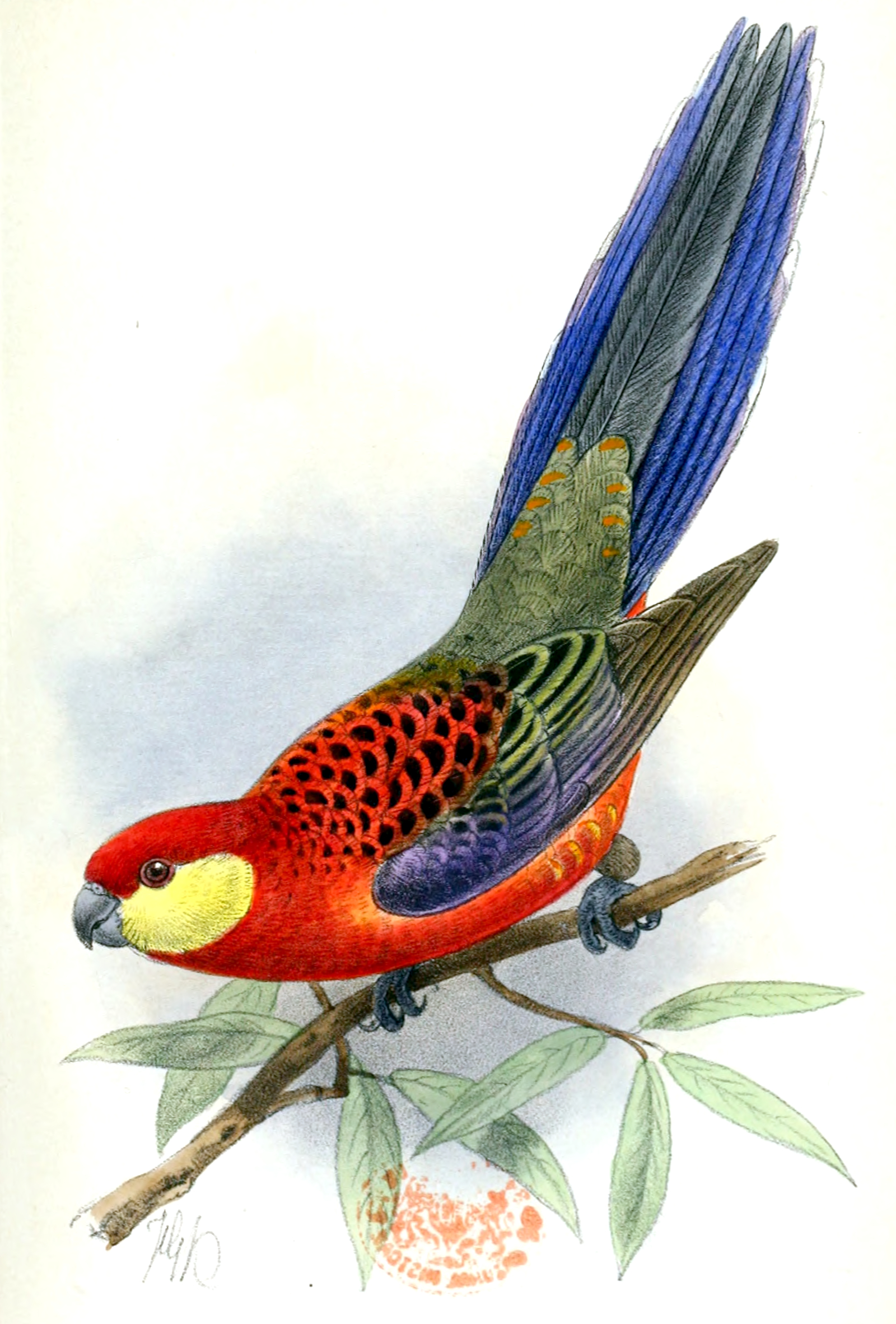
"Platycercus xanthogenys" Keulemans, 1891. This is an illustration of the type specimen of subspecies Platycercus icterotis xanthogenys.

Two subspecies are recognised at the Australian Faunal Directory, the nominate Platycercus icterotis icterotis and a description of inland specimens as subspecies Platycercus icterotis xanthogenys. The inland subspecies cites Tommaso Salvadori's 1891 description of a new species Platycercus xanthogenys, published in the Proceedings of the Zoological Society, emerging from his work on a catalogue of psittacine specimens at the British Museum; the latter work contains an illustration of the holotype by J. G. Keulemans. A revision in 1955 by Arthur Cain proposed the type locality for P. icterotis xanthogenys was Wongan Hills, arbitrarily, but accepted as logical in assuming that John Gould's field worker, John Gilbert, could have obtained a specimen there and it resembled those found occurring at that location. A revision by Herbert Condon, published in the Checklist of the Birds of Australia (RAOU, 1975), supports a classification of two subspecies:

- Platycercus (Violania) icterotis icterotis (Temminck & Kuhl, 1820)
  - synonyms: Psittacus icterotis Temminck & Kuhl, 1820 [and Temminck 1821]; Platycercus stanleyii Vigors, 1830; Platycercus icterotis salvadori Mathews.
- Platycercus (Violania) icterotis xanthogenys Salvadori, 1891
  - synonyms: Platycercus xanthogenys Salvadori, 1891; Platycercus icterotis whitlocki Mathews, 1912.

Revision and cataloguing in the 20th century began to examine the classification of the few known specimens, often supplied without location details, and, excepting A. J. North, cited the work of Savadori in 1891. In a review of material in the Tring collection in England, supplemented by Bernard Woodward at the Perth Museum and the collection of field worker J. T. Tunney, the trinomial Platycercus icterotis xanthogenys was published by Ernst Hartert in 1905. The author Gregory Mathews, an avid exponent of subspecific classification, cites the species Platycercus xanthogenys Salvadori, but disposed of the epithet xanthogenys when tentatively proposing three new taxa. Mathews notes Salvadori's separation of the type specimen from two others in the Gould collection, then held at the London museum, and caution in only giving the source of the skin as "unknown, but probably Australia". Mathews proposed three subspecies in 1912, each given a brief distinguishing remark to be expanded in a later volume of his series Birds of Australia.

The entry in that 1917 work addresses the type of nominate P. icterotis icterotis, which he had earlier ascribed to the location "Shark Bay". This was corrected by Mathews to the location "Albany, South-West Australia". In the preface to the same volume, Mathews attributes the material examined from the southwest of Australia to the collections of the botanist Robert Brown on the Flinders expedition. The author also corrected his reference to "Point Cloates", given in his 1912 determination of the unknown source of the type in Salvadori's 1891 description, Platycercus xanthogenys. He put the location beyond York, Western Australia. This is where John Gilbert was known to have collected when visiting the western colony in the 1830s. A new taxon P. icterotis salvadori (yellow-cheeked parrot) differentiates those found at Wilson's Inlet as "having less red on the mantle", and another, P. icterotis whitlocki (Dundas yellow-cheeked parrot), as smaller, less blue at the wing, and more subdued red feathers at the head in the specimens obtained from Lake Dundas (Dundas). The epithet whitlocki was used by authors in ornithological literature to honour the Western Australian field research of Frederick Lawson Whitlock. The notes of Whitlock and other authors reporting from Western Australia, including Tom Carter and A. W. Milligan, were assembled or quoted by Mathews. Errors introduced to the scant body of knowledge by himself and others were acknowledged. The variation in the colours of the back was proposed to accord with differing habitat or as a characteristic of fully mature plumage. He concluded there were at least two subspecies—approximating the coastal and inland forms—that may prove to be more diverse if a complete series of specimens was examined. The description of the population as two or three subspecific taxa by Mathews is cited within the species circumscription, his P. icterus whitlocki, along with Salvadori's P. xanthogenys, are noted as synonyms for the inland subspecies.

The platycercine parrots have seen various systematic arrangements to circumscribe the contentious sister taxa of northern and eastern Australia, most of which overlap in range and intergrade. One study resulted in new genera being published by Wells and Wellington in 1992. In their classification, the genus name Hesperapsittacus was described, and this species was proposed as the type. That revision was subsumed several years later, by Richard Schodde (1997), to subgeneric names; the name Hesperapsittacus became available for Schodde's subgenus, but he nominated their genus name Violania instead for the alliance of subgenus Platycercus (Violania) Wells & Wellington, 1992. Consequently, the two genera of Wells and Wellington, Violania and Hesperapsittacus, became synonymous with the subgeneric name of this species. This arrangement allies the western species to the "Platycercus eximius-adscitus-venustus" complex, which were separated to species by Les Christidis and Boles in 2008. The validity of the alliances in the subgeneric arrangement, especially of Platycercus (Violania), was tested in 2015, with a multilocus approach to phylogenetic analysis, and proposed a hypothesis that challenges the relationships within the genus.

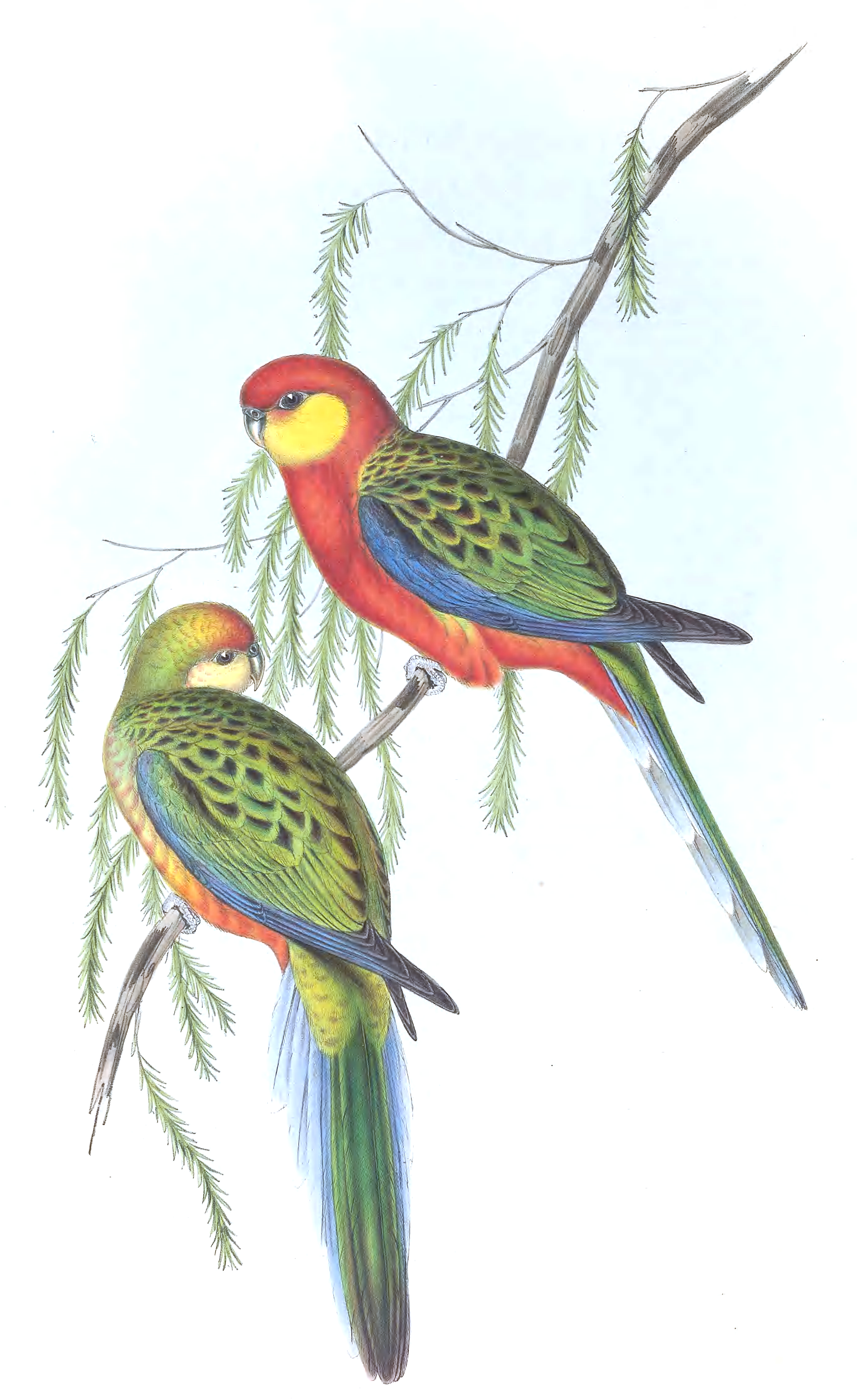
Henry Constantine Richter's Platycercus icterotis, rechristened the "Earl of Derby Parrakeet", 1848

Common names for moyadong include western rosella, rosehill, rosella and roselle, vernacular that appears to have elided from an early name for a species observed at Rose Hill, New South Wales, "Rose-Hiller", and translocated with its origin forgotten. The names Stanley rosella and yellow-cheeked rosella or parakeet are historical and trade alternatives. The name Western rosella was formally assigned by the Royal Australasian Ornithologists Union (RAOU) (now BirdLife Australia) in 1923 to distinguish the name rosella or 'rose-hiller'. These were retroactively assigned as geographic descriptors of the name 'rosella', an informal name that persisted from the colonial period into the 20th century. Gould also records 'rose-hill' as an informal ('colonial') name for this species and two others existing in the local language. An 1898 report of the Australasian Association for the Advancement of Science listing vernacular for Australian birds proposed "Yellow-cheeked Parrakeet" for this species.

Another early name was The Earl of Derby's Parrakeet, an appellation applied by Gould in 1848 to conserve the honour given to a titled Englishman Edward Smith-Stanley in the epithet used by Vigors, stanleyii, that was displaced by the rule of precedence with the earlier epithet, icterotis, assigned by Kuhl. Gould's explanation of his neologism in naming the 'parrakeet' was inserted with the apology "as bound by justice to the first describer … I feel I shall have the acquiescence of all ornithologists". The caption to the 1830 lithographs in Lear's Illustrations of the Family of Psittacidae, or Parrots also gives "Stanley Parrakeet" for his patron, then known as Lord Stanley, applying the name "Platycercus stanleyii" published by Vigors in the same year. Other terms are used to identify two specimens illustrated in Mathews Birds of Australia (v.6, 1917), distinguished by the descriptors 'red-mantled' and 'yellow-cheeked' parrots. The bird was marketed by dealers in England as a 'small variety' of the commonly kept rosella, P. eximius, and maintained the Earl's appellation. Popular names for the species in aviculture include Stanley rosella for the species, and the western rosella for the nominate form, and 'red-backed western' or 'Salvadori' rosella for the inland subspecies, P. icterosis xanthogenys, when recognised as distinct; the latter is noted and named for dark red feathers at the back. "Western Rosella" has been designated as the official name of the species by the International Ornithological Committee (IOC), the same name assigned by the RAOU in 1923.

The pre-existing names, derived from the Nyungar language, were recorded as regional and literal variants, representing dialectic shifts and often inconsistent spelling by the transcriber. These were first compiled by the colonial diarist George Fletcher Moore, supplementing the work of others with his own, and first published in 1842. The names of Moore and other authors were reviewed and published in Serventy and Whittell Birds of Western Australia (1948, & eds.), those recorded at "Perth", Good-un-goodt-un, Guddanang-uddan and Guldanguldan, and at "Avon River", Moy-a-duk and Moyadong, the second location referring to the district at Avon River. A recommended orthography and pronunciation list (Abbott, 2009) of Nyungar avian nomenclature, with broad cultural consultation, has proposed moyadong [moy’a’dawng] and kootonkooton [koot’awn’koot’awn] be adopted to complement the systematic nomenclature.

== Description ==
The smallest species of its genus, the adult western rosella weighs 60 to 70 g (2.1 to 2.5 oz) and is 25 to 30 cm (9.8 to 11.8 in) long. It has broad wings with a 35 to 41 cm (14 to 16 in) wingspan and a long tail that is on average 13 cm (5.1 in), equally half the measurement of its total length. It is the only species of the genus that exhibits marked differences in the coloration of the sexes —the red of the plumage is more scarlet in male P. icterotis. Females are less striking in their colouring, the more subdued red plumage being flecked with green and a smaller dull yellow patch at the cheek.

The adult male has a predominantly red head and neck, with a yellow cheek patch—bright yellow in the nominate subspecies and pale cream in subspecies xanthogenys. The red feathers are fringed with black when new. The back has indistinct black feathers mottled with red, green, and buff variation, being scalloped with these colours at the feather's edges. When folded, the wing is green, becoming black with green margins on the shoulder, with a narrow dark blue shoulder patch and blue-edged dark primary coverts. The blue of the flight feathers and coverts at the underwing is apparent when taking to the air. The upper tail coverts and rump are green tending to olive, perhaps with a red margin. The central tail rectrices are blue and green, outer tail feathers are a similar blue with a white tip. The undertail feathers are blue with white fringes. The underparts are red with green flanks. The beak is pale blue-grey with a dark grey cere. The legs and feet are slate grey, and the iris is dark brown.

In the adult female, most of the red plumage of the head, neck and underparts is replaced by green, bar a solid red band across the forehead. The yellow cheek patch is smaller, and there are no red feathers on the back and scapulars. The female has a broad white or cream bar on the underwing.

Immature birds resemble the adult female though with even more green plumage, red only on the crown, and lacking a yellow cheek patch entirely. The bill and cere are light pink, changing to adult coloration by six months of age.

The population has a cline in colour variation from east to west, and variable degrees of hybridisation are reported east of the Darling Range and in the southern region and Stirling Range. This intergrading between forms is recorded at locations such as Albany. Southwest Australia is also inhabited by similar, albeit larger, parrots—the red-capped parrot (Purpureicephalus spurius), readily distinguished by its yellow rump, and Port Lincoln Barnardius zonarius parrots, which present a blue cheek and black head in contrast to the green, red and yellow of this species.

=== Vocalisations ===
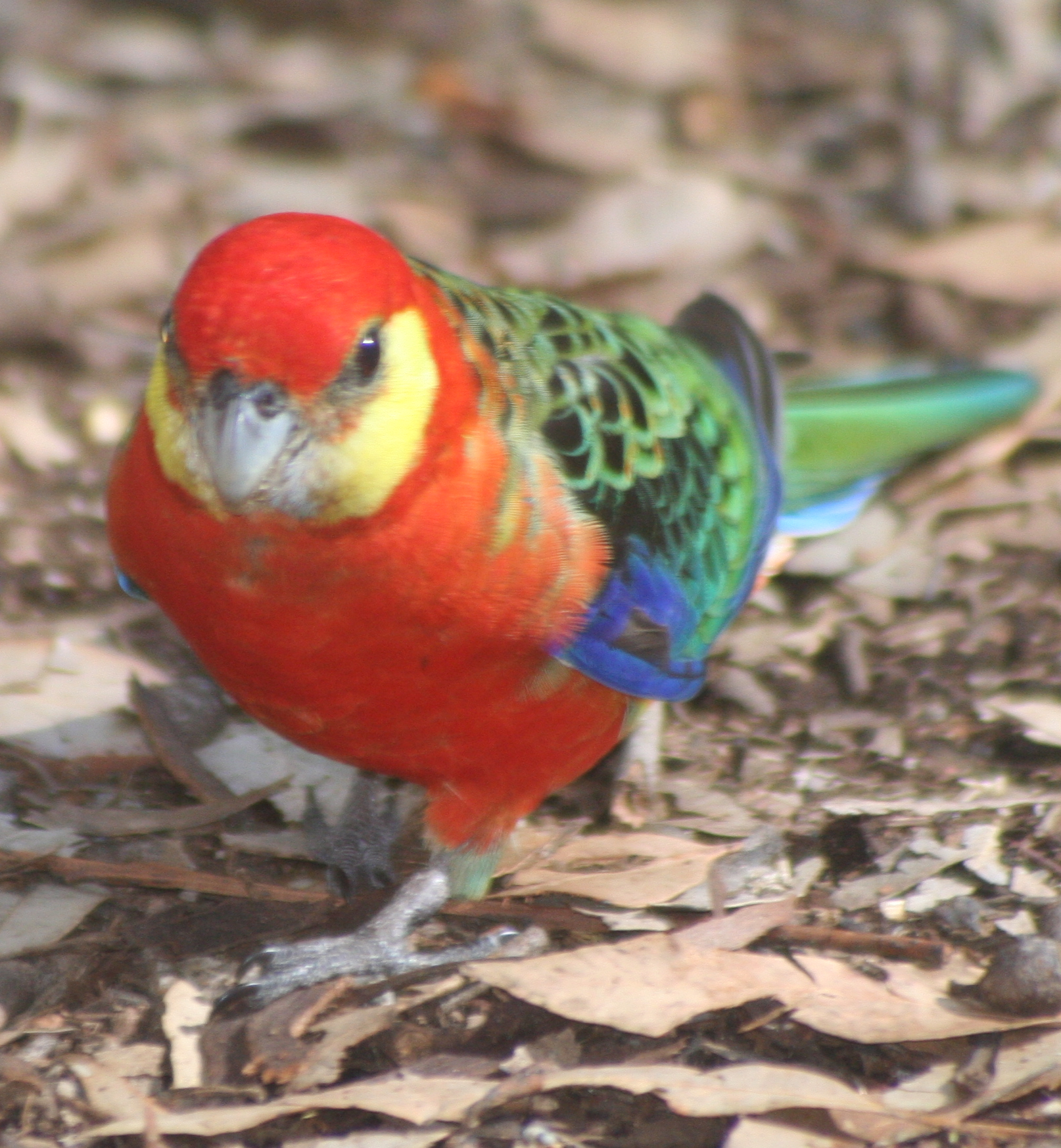
Male adult walking through leaf litter

The regular vocalisation is a rapid series of melodious notes delivered at a low volume. The vocalisation of sister species of other regions is notably louder and more frequently heard in raucous exchanges with other individuals or species. The transliterations of the soft and musical sounds include ching-ching-ching (Morcombe, et al), chink-chink (Serventy, Simpson) and pink-pink (Johnstone, et al), although they more often remain quiet and unheard. Gould (1848) reported the whistling of the notes as a feeble, piping sound and the rich variation in the series might be regarded "as almost to assume the character of a song". Other sources identify two vocalisations, a resonant and high frequency quink, quink, quink, quink and the softer voiced call of whip-a-whee.

The contact call is similar to, although louder than the mulga parrot (Psephotellus varius).

== Distribution and habitat ==
The western rosella is endemic to the southwest of Australia, isolated from sister species of the north and east of the country. Moderately common, it is usually sedentary, frequenting forest and many other types of wooded country or kwongan. It also occurs in farmland or at other feeding opportunities, and is most often observed at sites cleared of vegetation. The captive occurrence in Australia and several other continents began before 1830 in England.

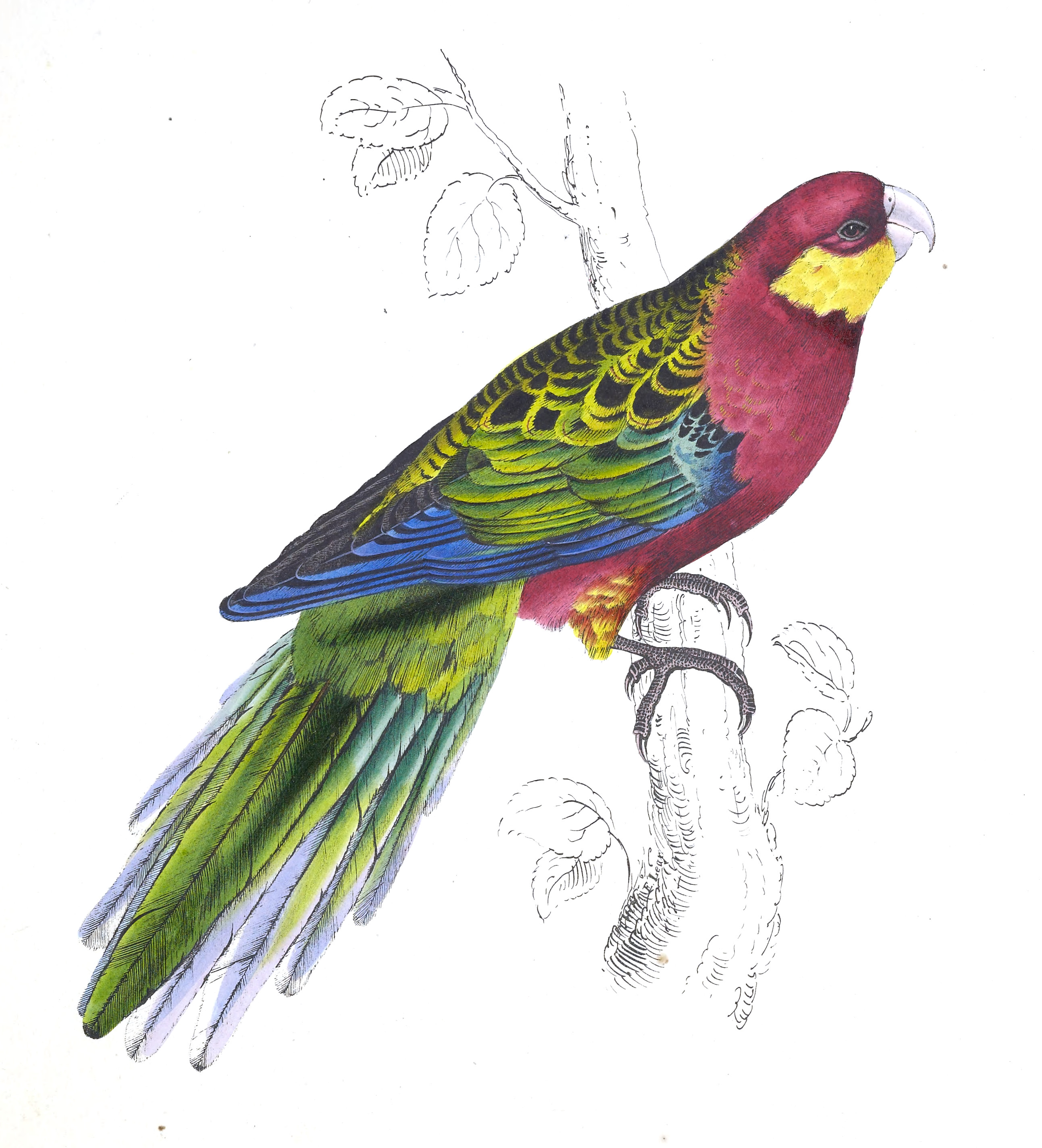
Plate 23 of Illustrations of the Family of Psittacidae, or Parrots, first depiction of the species by Edward Lear, November to December 1830, entitled "Platycercus Stanleyii / Stanley Parrakeet", named for the patron Lord Stanley

The two subspecies are geographically adjacent—P. icterotis xanthogenys at the wheatbelt region, inland to the north and east of the range and P. icterotis icterotis occurring at coastal areas in the south and west. The inland boundary of the species' range extends from the area between the lower part of the Swan River and the Arrowsmith River at the western coast. From there it passes to the east and south before Southern Cross, the Fraser Range, Esperance, Stirling Ranges and Kojonup. The line of demarcation between the inland and coastal subspecies begins east of King George Sound and lies to the northwest via Mount Barker and the Kojonup region toward the Bannister River. The species is less common on the Swan Coastal Plain than in southern areas of the wheatbelt, where it is more frequently observed around Narrogin and Katanning at remnant wandoo woodland, They occur throughout the conservation area at Dryandra Woodland. Authors came to express doubts on the status of the subspecies, and compiled observations show no geographical separation.

The historical records of the species indicate it relatively uncommon, although it has been noted more often in southern regions. The northernmost extent of the distribution range is near Moora, with records extending toward the east around Norseman. The population of the species has declined significantly since colonisation, especially the inland P. icterotis xenogenys after the 1970s. It became locally extinct in shires where it had previously been recorded, these include: Coorow, Dandaragan, Moora, Dalwallinu, Merredin, Quairading, Serpentine-Jarrahdale and the Shire of Murray. Population declines have also been recorded in the shires of Swan, Kalamunda, Northam, York, Armadale-Kelmscott, Capel and Dumbleyung. This disappearance at northern and eastern parts of the Wheatbelt is the result of habitat removal, and no shires show an increase in records. The adaptation to introduced agricultural crops has been comparatively limited when contrasted with the range of seeds harvested by ringnecks Barnardius zonarius and others species. This is likely to have restricted their success in migration to or re-population of greatly altered landscapes. The suggested movement after breeding toward the coast during the austral summer, from areas in the north of the range, lacked evidence of large-scale seasonal movement in occurrence data,

The distribution of P. icterotis icterotis is restricted to humid and subhumid regions, an area south of Dandaragan and lower reaches of the Moore River, and to the west of: Wannamal, Muchea, Mundaring, Jarrahdale, Marrinup, Collie, Boyup Brook, Hay River (upper), and from the ranges of Porongurups and Green Range. Records for P. icterotis xanthogenys are from the southern interior of Western Australia, semiarid climatic zones, that formerly included Wongan Hills and occurrences at: Kununoppin, Moorine Rock, Parker Range, Yardina Rock and Ten Mile Rocks. The range extends to the west at: Toodyay, Dale River, Mt Saddleback and Kojonup and north of the Stirling Range, Fitzgerald River (lower), Ravensthorpe, Frank Hann National Park and Red Lake. The occurrence farther north is termed casual, the locations are: Mt Jackson, Karalee and Gnarlbine Rock.

A significant change in abundance was noted at Grass Patch, where it was common in the mid-20th century and reappeared after a fifteen-year absence in later decades. The erroneous locations reported by Mathews, Point Cloates and Shark Bay, were later admitted to have been incorrect by the author; he also identifies the obvious error in Gould's protologue (1837) in extending the range from King George Sound to "… New South Wales. etc.". The species was later reported by Gould (1848) as only known at the Swan River Colony, a location where it is now uncommon.

They favour woodland habitat with sheoak (Allocasuarina), wurak (Eucalyptus salmonophloia) and wandoo (Eucalyptus wandoo, et al), but have sometimes flourished at areas cleared for introduced grain crops in the region's Wheatbelt. They also appear at other cleared areas adjoining bushland, such as roadsides, golf courses and reserves, to harvest grasses or weeds. The subspecies occur in differing types of vegetation, living in communities associated with their woody upper-storey plants. The coastal subspecies P. icterotis icterotis is seen amongst the eucalypts and paperbarks of the high rainfall area from Jurien to Green Range, east of Manypeaks, namely marri (Corymbia calophylla), karri (Eucalyptus diversicolor), moitch (E. rudis) and the paperbark (Melaleuca). They are known to feed on the fruit of Bossiaea linophylla and Leucopogon obovatus, the flowers of marris and fleshy part of the seed of Macrozamia riedlei. The subspecies feeds both on the ground and in trees. The wooded scrub of the lower rainfall inland region inhabited by P. icterotis xanthogenys is generalised as eucalypt and sheoak, the trees moitch, wandoo (Eucalyptus wandoo), wurak and in tall mallee country or the habitat at the rock, or sighing, sheoak (Allocasuarina huegeliana). This subspecies feeds at seeding wandoo, Acacia huegeliana, Glischrocaryon flavescens and Olearia revoluta and flowering Eucalyptus eremophila and Melaleuca acuminata.

== Behaviour ==
The western rosella usually socialises in pairs, but congregates in groups of twenty or so to forage when the season or opportunity permits; numbers in a flock are occasionally recorded up to twenty-six. The birds are discreet in their behaviours—more so than other rosellas—and will remain unobserved when feeding on the ground beneath the understory of a woodland or sheltering during the day in the dense foliage of trees. The usual tendency of individuals is to remain sedentary, although birds may venture out to abundant sources of seed. Individuals feeding in the open are not usually disturbed by human presence and can be approached quite closely. They appear to move with ease as they walk, and in their undulating flight, when the wing is drawn to their side. Their flight is more 'buoyant' than the laden efforts of the other larger species of the genus.

=== Breeding ===
The breeding habits of the western rosella have not been well-studied; females enter nesting hollows from July, with males doing so from mid-August. Eggs are laid from late August to late September and hatch late September to late October. Young birds fledge (leave the nest) late October to mid-November. The group in a study at Wickepin and Dudinin (Kulin Shire) was observed to begin occupancy of nest sites in July, the routine of the female being fed by the male being established in the week before laying the brood.

The western rosella nests in hollows and spout-shaped holes of living and dead trees, generally eucalypts and most commonly karri and wandoo. The trees are generally large and old, with one study establishing an average age of 290 years for the host tree. Eucalypts are a preferred tree species in which to lay their eggs, the dominant Eucalyptus marginata of jarrah forest, or in the tall forest tree karri, but they especially favour wandoo. Holes in tree stumps and fence posts are also used. Other trees selected include eucalypts such as marri, wurak, yandee E. loxophleba (york gum) and moitch (flooded gum).

The hollows are usually a meter or so deep, and those that have dust created by boring insects in the bottom are preferred. The brood is laid directly onto the wood dust or debris in the cavity selected; the site is otherwise unadorned. The dimensional description of the nest site, relating height, depth and entrance size used by the species, was included in a study of animals occupying tree cavities in jarrah forest, and intended to assist in determining the amount of suitable habitat removed and remaining after logging. The nest site is typically a spout shaped entrance, between 45–105 millimetres (1.8–4.1 inches) in width, at a hollow between 0.35–1.5 metres (14–59 inches) in depth leading to a green limb.

One brood is usually reared per breeding season, though often two are in captivity. The clutch size is between two and seven (rarely nine) eggs, with the average being around six. The shell has a slight gloss, and the shape is elliptical. The average size of eggs is 22 by 26 millimetres (0.87 by 1.02 inches). Measurements from a sample of 29 eggs gave a size range of 23.5–27.7 millimetres (0.93–1.09 inches) × 19.9–22.5 millimetres (0.78–0.89 inches). Only the female incubates the eggs, leaving the nest in the morning and afternoon to eat food found by the male. The male remains close to the site, feeding at ground level and moving to an upper branch to call when catering to the brooding female.

The young emerge from the egg after an incubation period of 23 to 25 days, and leave the nest approximately five weeks after that. The nestlings have yellowish bills and display down at the rear that is pale grey, after they emerge from their egg. The success rate of egg numbers surviving to become independent individuals, while assumed to be seasonally variable, was measured in one survey to be 72%.

=== Feeding ===
The diet consists primarily of seeds, often those of introduced weeds and crops, although typically from eucalypt, sheoak and other native plants of the wooded environment. This is supplemented with nectar and insects especially during the breeding and feeding of young. The harvesting of introduced species includes the capeweed (Arctotheca calendula), thistles (Carduus spp.), flatweed (Hypochaeris spp.) and the subterranean clover (Trifolium subterraneum). Nectar, insects and their larvae, and fruit are also eaten, especially during the breeding season.

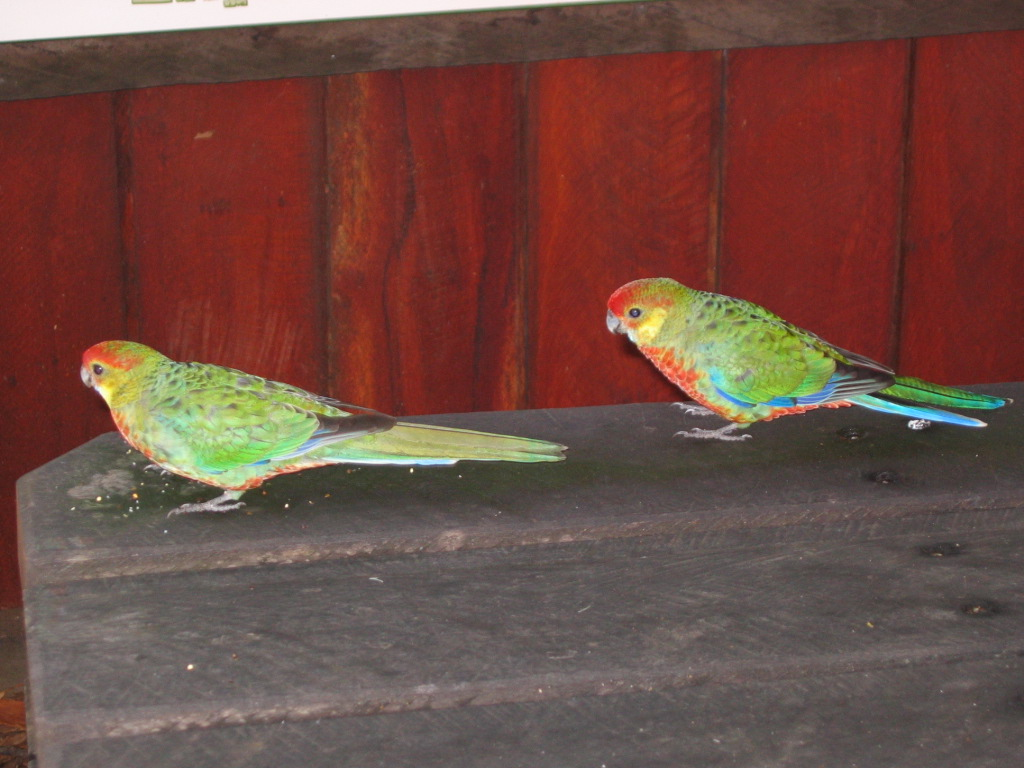
Immature birds at a picnic area in karri forest

They exhibit little caution in rural areas, gleaning seeds at paddocks after harvests or inside buildings and animal pens. The habit of visiting colonial farmland for seed and soft fruit, and lack of concern at human presence, was first reported by Gould in the years immediately following the region's settlement by the English. Tom Carter later extended this familiarity of the species to its casual entrance into buildings in search of food. A 1984 study of three parrots of the Southwest, all of which were observed to feed mainly on seed and fruit of introduced species, noted that the impact on soft fruit crops was less than red-capped parrot and Port Lincoln Barnardius zonarius parrot species. The damage to crops is regarded as minimal, appearing to eat fruit in orchards already damaged by those parrots and mainly gleaning for seed when feeding near protea flower crops.

== Conservation status ==
For the perceived impact on agriculture, the species had been declared vermin by the Western Australian state in 1921. The western rosella remained a declared agricultural pest until 1998, when it was instead declared to be a 'protected native species' and its destruction was prohibited. The state's governmental response was to warn of prosecution and issue general advice and licensing for the use of non-lethal firearms and netting over trees for deterrence; licenses for the extermination of the species were available on application in 2009. The conservation status of the species is as protected fauna, and of the inland subspecies is one of "likely to become extinct". In the assessment of the inland P. icterotis xanthogenys for the federal government's Action Plan for Australian Birds 2000 it was assigned the status of 'near threatened'. The 2013 assessment by the International Union for Conservation of Nature (IUCN) on their IUCN redlist assigns a status of species of least concern. It notes the species has become less common and locally extinct and the population trend is declining due to removal of habitat. Like most species of parrots, the western rosella is protected by the Convention on International Trade in Endangered Species of Wild Fauna and Flora (CITES). It is placed on the Appendix II list of vulnerable species, which makes the import, export and trade of listed wild-caught animals illegal.

P. icterotis was used in a comparative study of tolerance in some Australian birds to sodium fluoroacetate, a highly toxic substance that occurs in plants of the southwest and commercially branded as "1080", to evaluate their sensitivity against the exposure and mobility of other species. This species and the red-capped parrot—both endemic—express a high tolerance of the potentially lethal salt.

== Captivity ==
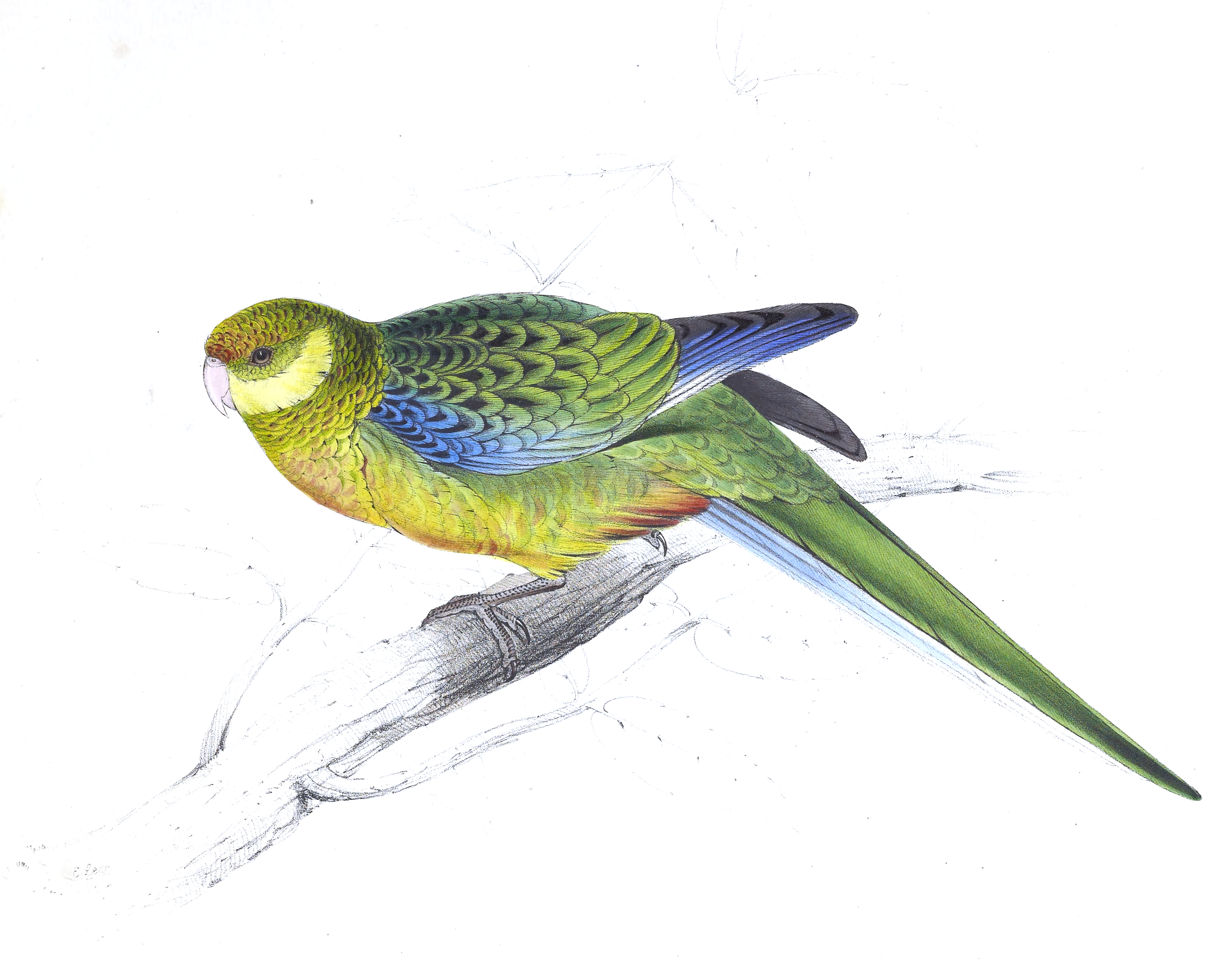
Plate 24 of Lear's Illustrations (1830), depicting a captive specimen in England.

Western rosellas are a popular bird in aviaries and for zoological gardens, displaying the favourable characteristics of related species without the reputation for aggression and raucous vocalisation. Their status in Australian aviculture is classified as secure.

The species is able to breed in the first year, and females may lay up to two broods. Along with a reputation as being placid in nature, the success of their reproduction has increased the population in captivity. An individual cock, aged twelve and onward, was reported by one enthusiast (Whelan, 1977) to have sired twenty-seven progeny over four seasons. Popular interest in the captive form, red-backed Western rosella, which purports or adopts the subspecific description, P. icterotis xanthogenys (Salvadori), was supported by research published in Western Australia. The author (Philpott, 1986) sought to identify and discriminate plumage between the red-backed (inland) and nominate form, nominally the subspecies of coastal regions P. icterotis icterotis. Several characteristics were identified, and later tabulated and summarised by workers in aviculture. Apart from the more subdued green and yellow of the inland form, the chin is white—rather than yellow—extending out to lighten the cheek patch. The same red-backed individuals were observed to have a second stripe at the underwing of fledglings, less distinct and closer to the base of the secondary feathers. This disappears from view after two months and altogether in the males of the form.

Sexing individuals by comparison of the colouring does not present the difficulties found in other captive rosellas, being markedly sexually dimorphic they are easily assigned. Unusually, head scratching is done by arching out the foot behind and over the wing. As with the white-cheeked rosellas, the underwing stripe that is characteristic of juveniles in the genus is retained into maturity by the females. Nesting boxes in aviaries are destroyed if not reinforced, chewing on logs is preferred and these provide hollows for laying a clutch of eggs. The breeding season occurs from September until January, the clutch of four to five eggs is incubated in around twenty days. Fledging is about twenty-five days after hatching, full adult feathers appear at around fourteen months.

P. icterotis had been successfully maintained in 19th century aviaries and menageries in Australia and overseas. From the beginning of the 20th century, confirmation emerges of them also being bred and raised in captivity. The specimens painted by Lear, two living captives in England, were published in Illustrations of the Family of Psittacidae between 1830 and 1832. The first record of breeding in England was by two aviculturalists in July 1908, with another reporting success later that year. A bird breeder in Kendal produced young from 1910 to 1915. The species became uncommon in English aviculture during the 1950s, and those available said to be poor specimens. An attempt was made to breed a wild caught pair imported under license. Hybrids between this species and mealy rosella, and less successfully with red-rumps, were also produced there.

In a sampling of captive birds in Poland for detection of the bacteria Chlamydophila psittaci, implicated in the infectious disease psittacosis, the testing of a single specimen of P. icterotis in the baseline data set of apparently uninfected birds was found to be positive.

== Cited sources ==
classification

- "Subgenus Platycercus (Violania) [complete]". Australian Faunal Directory. Department of Energy and Environment. "Taxonomic Decision for synonymy: Schodde, R., 1997."
  - Schodde, R. in Schodde, R. & Mason, I.J. 1997. Aves (Columbidae to Coraciidae). In, Houston, W.W.K. & Wells, A. (eds). Zoological Catalogue of Australia. Melbourne : CSIRO Publishing, Australia Vol. 37.2 xiii 440 pp. [179]
- "Species Platycercus (Violania) icterotis [complete]". Australian Faunal Directory. Department of Energy and Environment. "Taxonomic Decision for Subspecies Arrangement: Condon, H.T. 1975."
  - Condon, H.T. (1975). Checklist of the Birds of Australia. Part 1 Non-Passerines. Melbourne: Royal Australasian Ornithologists Union. pp. 196–97.

texts

- Higgins, P.J. (1999). Handbook of Australian, New Zealand and Antarctic Birds. Volume 4: Parrots to Dollarbird. Melbourne, Victoria: Oxford University Press. ISBN 978-0-19-553071-1.
- Johnstone, R.E.; Storr, G.M. (1998). Taylor, Deborah (ed.). Handbook of Western Australian birds. Vol. v.1 — non passerines. Perth: Western Australian Museum. ISBN 978-0730712084.
- Lendon, Alan H. (1980). Australian Parrots in Field and Aviary. Angus & Robertson. ISBN 978-0-207-12424-2.
- Morcombe, Michael (1986). The Great Australian Birdfinder. Sydney: Lansdowne Press. ISBN 978-0-7018-1962-0.
- Serventy, D. L.; Whittell, H. M.; Seymour, Olive (ill.) (1951). A handbook of the birds of Western Australia (with the exception of the Kimberley division) (2nd ed.). Perth: Paterson Brokensha. pp. 229–30, fig. 3.
- Shephard, Mark (1989). Aviculture in Australia: Keeping and Breeding Aviary Birds. Prahran, Victoria: Black Cockatoo Press. ISBN 978-0-9588106-0-9.
- Simpson, Ken & Day, Nicolas (1996). Field Guide to the Birds of Australia. Viking. ISBN 978-0-670-86305-1.
