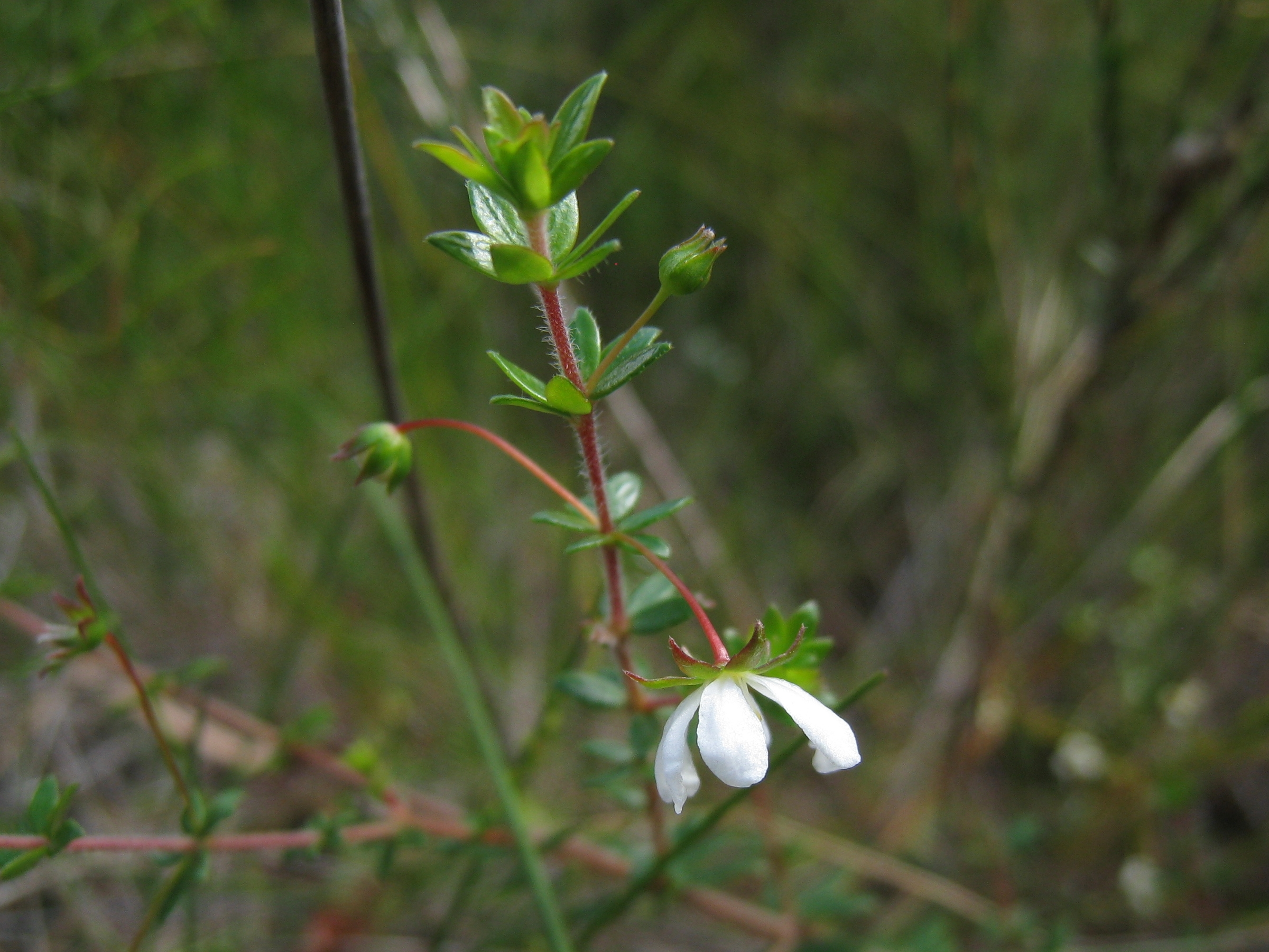

Scientific classification
- Kingdom: Plantae
- Clade: Tracheophytes
- Clade: Angiosperms
- Clade: Eudicots
- Clade: Rosids
- Order: Oxalidales
- Family: Cunoniaceae
- Genus: Bauera
- Species: B. microphylla

Binomial name
- Bauera microphylla D.Don

Synonyms
- Bauera rubioides var. microphylla DC. nom. illeg.; Bauera microphylla var. microphylla Hook.f.

= Bauera microphylla =

Species of flowering plant

Pink form

Bauera microphylla is a species of flowering plant in the family Cunoniaceae. It is endemic to New South Wales, Australia. It is a small shrub with trifoliate, sometimes toothed leaves, and usually white, pedicellate flowers.

== Description ==
Bauera microphylla is a trailing shrub that typically grows to a height of 30 cm (12 in) and has a many spreading branches. The leaves are trifoliate, the leaflets mostly 2–9 mm (0.079–0.354 in) long, 1.0–2.5 mm (0.039–0.098 in) wide and sometimes have two to six teeth on each edge. The flowers are borne on pedicels more than 5 mm (0.20 in) long and have five to seven toothed sepals 3–6 mm (0.12–0.24 in) long, five to seven usually white petals 3–6 mm (0.12–0.24 in) long, and ten to thirty cream-coloured stamens. Flowering occurs in spring and summer.

== Taxonomy ==
Bauera microphylla was first formally described in 1830 by David Don in the Edinburgh New Philosophical Journal, from specimens collected by George Caley. The specific epithet (microphylla) means "small leaves".

== Distribution and habitat ==
This species of Bauera mostly grows in near-coastal heath north from Wollongong in New South Wales.
