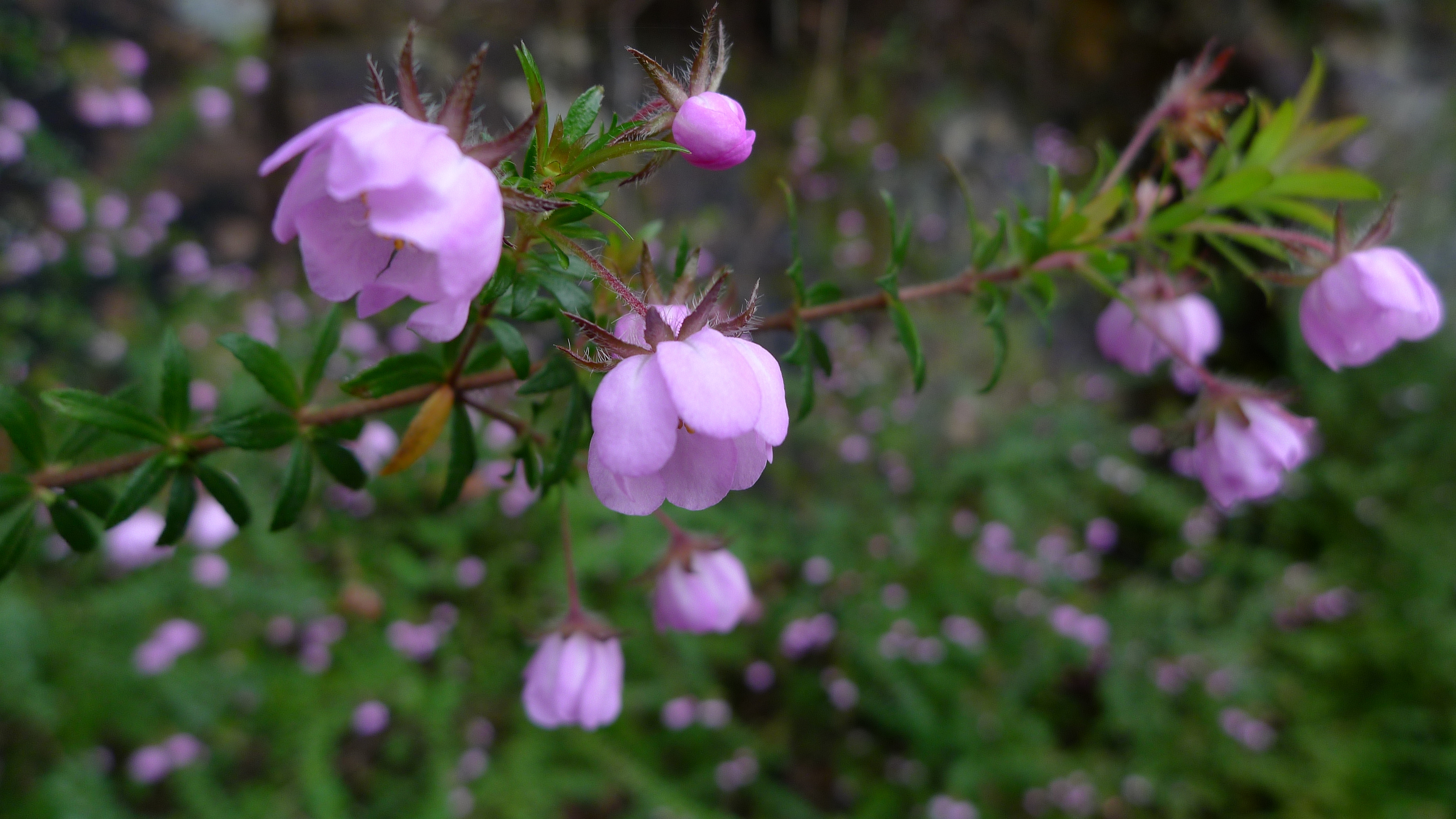
- Bauera rubioides in the Royal National Park

Scientific classification
- Kingdom: Plantae
- Clade: Tracheophytes
- Clade: Angiosperms
- Clade: Eudicots
- Clade: Rosids
- Order: Oxalidales
- Family: Cunoniaceae
- Genus: Bauera
- Species: B. rubioides

Binomial name
- Bauera rubioides Andrews

= Bauera rubioides =

River rose

Species of flowering plant

Bauera rubioides, commonly known as river rose, dog rose or wiry bauera, is a species of flowering plant in the family Cunoniaceae and is endemic to south-eastern Australia. It is a scrambling, tangled shrub with wiry branches, trifoliate, usually toothed leaves, and pink or white flowers.

== Description ==
Bauera rubioides is a scrambling, tangled shrub that typically grows to a height of up to 2 m (6 ft 7 in) and has wiry, extensively-branched stems. The leaves are trifoliate, the leaflets narrowly elliptic, mostly 3–15 mm (0.12–0.59 in) long, 1.5–5.0 mm (0.059–0.197 in) wide and usually have four to ten teeth on each edge. The flowers are borne on pedicels more than 5 mm (0.20 in) long and have six to eight toothed sepals 3–4 mm (0.12–0.16 in) long, six to eight usually pink sometimes white, petals 6–8 mm (0.24–0.31 in) long, and usually fifty to sixty cream-coloured stamens. Flowering mostly occurs in spring and summer.

== Taxonomy ==
Bauera rubioides was first formally described in 1801 by Henry Cranke Andrews in The Botanist's Repository for New, and Rare Plants. Andrews noted "...the whole plant has, at first sight, much the appearance of a Rubus." John Sims recorded in Curtis's Botanical Magazine that "...the trivial name is derived from the resemblance which it bears, especially in its young state, to a Rubia, not a Rubus, as Mr. Andrews, with his usual accuracy, would have it."

== Distribution and habitat ==
River rose grows in wet, often shaded areas in south-eastern Queensland, the coast and ranges of New South Wales, in southern Victoria, south-eastern South Australia and it is common in Tasmania.

== Use in horticulture ==
Bauera rubioides is readily grown from cuttings and is hardy in moist, well-drained soil in full sun or light shade.
