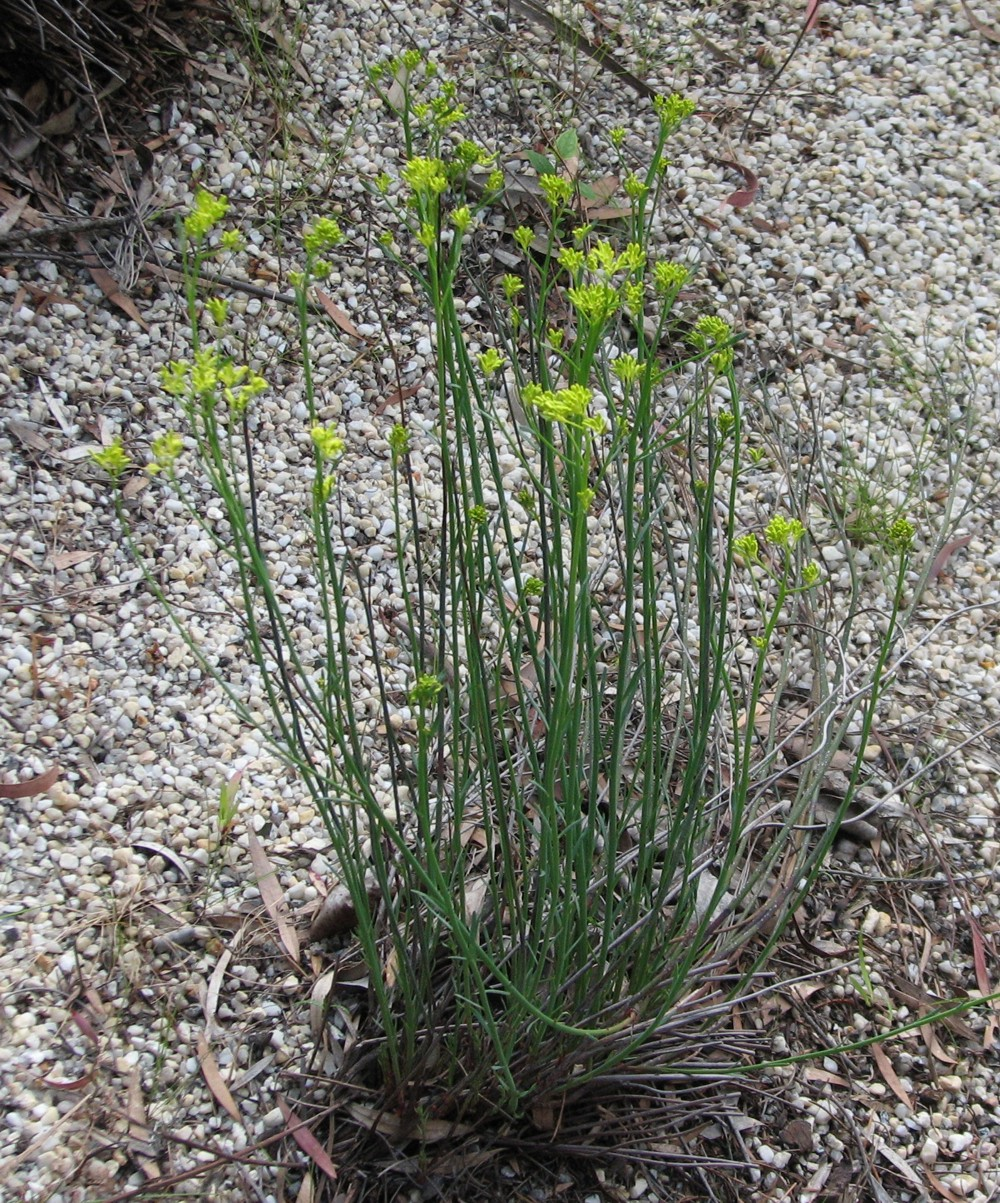
- Glischrocaryon behrii

Scientific classification
- Kingdom: Plantae
- Clade: Tracheophytes
- Clade: Angiosperms
- Clade: Eudicots
- Order: Saxifragales
- Family: Haloragaceae
- Genus: Glischrocaryon; Endl.

Species
- See text

Synonyms
- Loudonia Lindl.

= Glischrocaryon =

Genus of flowering plants

Glischrocaryon (common name: Golden pennants) is a genus of flowering plants in the family Haloragaceae, endemic to Australia. Species occur in New South Wales, Victoria, South Australia and Western Australia.

== Species ==
Species in the genus include:

- Glischrocaryon angustifolium (Nees) M.L. Moody & Les
- Glischrocaryon aureum (Lindl.) Orchard Common Popflower
- Glischrocaryon behrii (Schltdl.) Orchard Golden Pennants
- Glischrocaryon flavescens (J.Drumm.) Orchard
- Glischrocaryon roei Endl.

== Bibliography ==
- "Glischrocaryon". Australian Plant Name Index (APNI), IBIS database. Centre for Plant Biodiversity Research, Australian Government, Canberra. Archived from the original on 15 June 2022.
- "Glischrocaryon". FloraBase. Western Australian Government Department of Biodiversity, Conservation and Attractions.
- "Genus Glischrocaryon". PlantNET - New South Wales Flora Online. Royal Botanic Gardens & Domain Trust, Sydney Australia. Archived from the original on 25 July 2008.
- Orchard, A. E. (October 1970). "Glischrocaryon: The Correct Name for Loudonia (Haloragaceae)". Taxon. 19 (5): 823–824. doi:10.2307/1219316. JSTOR 1219316.
