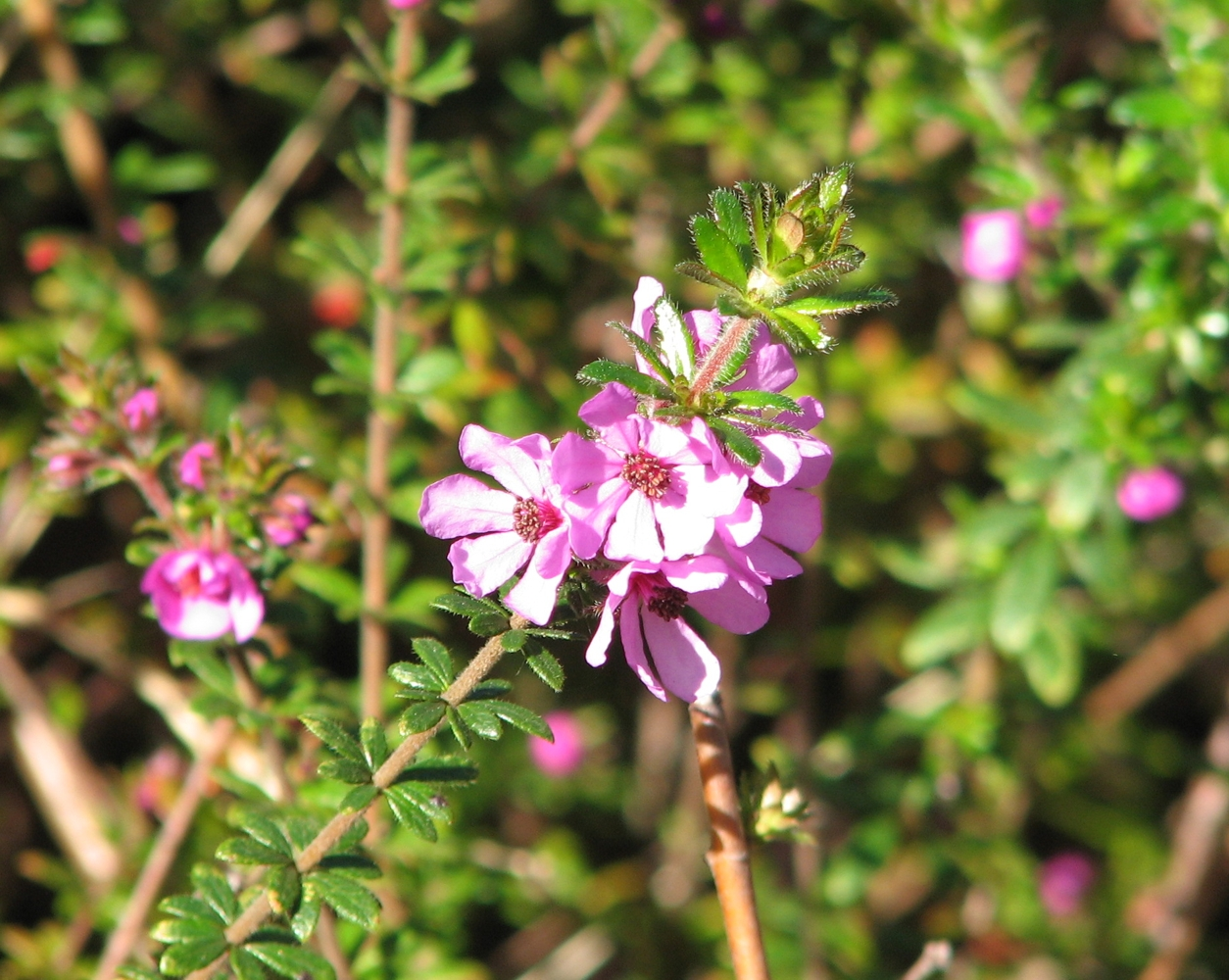
- Bauera sessiliflora

Scientific classification
- Kingdom: Plantae
- Clade: Tracheophytes
- Clade: Angiosperms
- Clade: Eudicots
- Clade: Rosids
- Order: Oxalidales
- Family: Cunoniaceae
- Genus: Bauera; Banks ex Andrews

= Bauera =

Genus of flowering plants

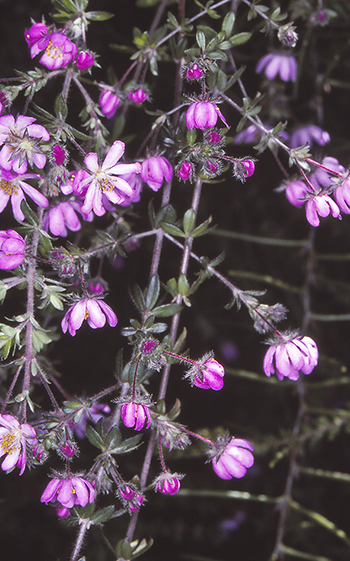
Bauera rubioides

Bauera is a genus of four species of flowering plants in the family Cunoniaceae, all endemic to eastern Australia. Plants in the genus Bauera are shrubs with trifoliate leaves arranged in opposite pairs and have flowers with four to ten sepals and four to ten white or pink petals.

== Description ==
Plants in the genus Bauera are erect or prostrate shrubs with trifoliate leaves arranged in opposite pairs, appearing to be simple leaves arranged in whorls of six. The flowers are arranged singly in leaf axils and are bisexual, with four to ten spreading sepals. There are four to ten pink or white petals, that are egg-shaped with the narrower end towards the base and longer than the sepals. There are four to many stamens with thread-like filaments and the ovary has two fused carpels and two styles. The fruit is a loculicidal capsule.

== Taxonomy ==
The genus Bauera was first formally described by Henry Cranke Andrews in The Botanist's Repository from an unpublished description by Joseph Banks, and the first species he published was Bauera rubioides. The genus was named in honour of brothers Ferdinand Bauer and Franz Bauer, who were Austrian botanical illustrators.

=== Species list ===
The following is a list of Bauera species accepted by the Australian Plant Census as of December 2021:

- Bauera capitata Ser. ex DC. (Qld., N.S.W.)
- Bauera microphylla D.Don (N.S.W.)
- Bauera rubioides Andrews – dog rose, river rose (S.A., Qld., N.S.W., Vic., Tas.)
- Bauera sessiliflora F.Muell. – Grampians bauera (Vic.)
