= Kraken Cove =

Kraken Cove (57°3′S 26°41′W) is the largest cove at Candlemas Island, South Sandwich Islands, indenting the north coast of the island, just west of Demon Point and north of Gorgon Pool. The name applied by the UK Antarctic Place-Names Committee in 1971 is that of a legendary Norwegian sea monster, the Kraken.
