= Sea serpent (disambiguation) =

A sea serpent is a mythological sea creature either wholly or partly serpentine.

Sea Serpent or The Sea Serpent may refer to:

- Sea Serpent (clipper), 1850 clipper ship which sailed in the San Francisco and China trade
- Sea-Serpent, a steam yacht, formerly HMS Squirrel (1904)
- Sea Serpent (roller coaster), at Morey's Piers in Wildwood, New Jersey
- Sea Serpent (roller coaster element), a double-inversion element with vertical loop halves connected by half corkscrews
- Sea Serpent Cove, a cove in the South Sandwich Islands
- The Sea Serpent, 1901 adventure novel by Jules Verne
- The Sea Serpent (aka Hydra, the Sea Monster), a 1984 Spanish horror film directed by Amando de Ossorio
- Sea Serpent, a variant of the Gabriel (missile) developed by Israel's IAI and Thales
- Sea Serpent (ASW), a US Anti Submarine system.

== See also ==
- Hydrophiinae, or sea snakes
- Phycodurus and Phyllopteryx, genera of fish, also known as sea snakes or seadragons
- Hydrus, a Southern Hemisphere constellation, the 'lesser Water Snake', or sea snake
- Oarfish
- King of herrings
- Sea serpent roll, a roller coaster inversion related to the cobra roll
- Mare Anguis, or "Serpent Sea", a lunar mare on the near side of the Moon
