= Tramcar (Wildwood, New Jersey) =

Transport system in the Wildwoods, NJ, US

Sightseers Tram Car
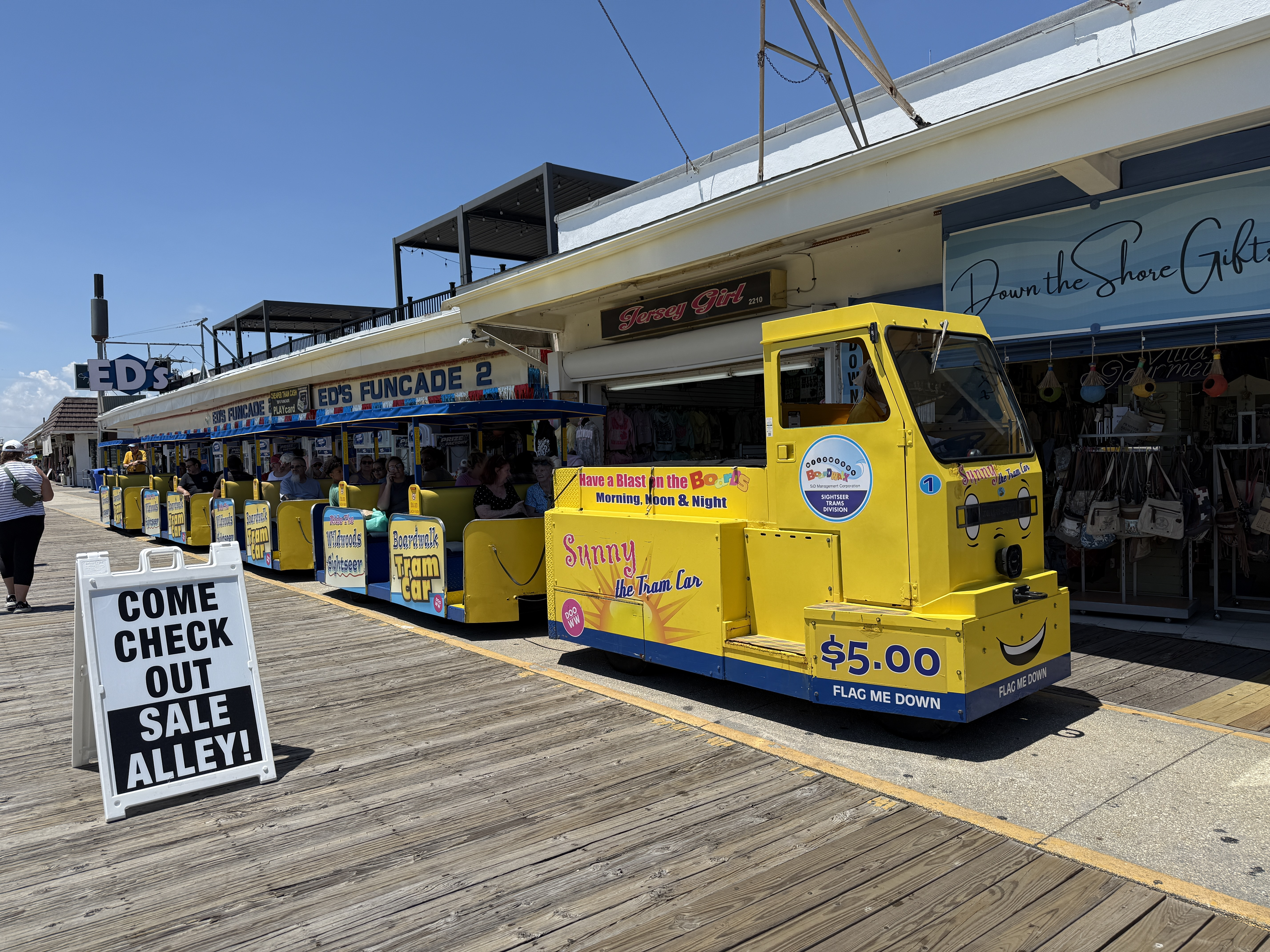
- The Tramcar on the Wildwoods Boardwalk
- Founded: June 11, 1949
- Headquarters: 5308 Boardwalk; Wildwood, NJ 08260
- Service area: The Wildwoods
- Service type: Trackless train
- Routes: Wildwood Boardwalk
- Fuel type: Rechargeable battery
- Website: https://www.dooww.com/tramcar

The Sightseers Tram Car (commonly referred to as the Tramcar) is a trackless train service running on the Boardwalk in the Cape May County, New Jersey communities of Wildwood and North Wildwood. The service, which began on June 11, 1949, takes passengers along the two-mile-long (3.2 km) Wildwood Boardwalk. Service is available at all points along the boardwalk, from the beginning at Cresse Avenue to the end at 16th Avenue in North Wildwood.

== Description ==
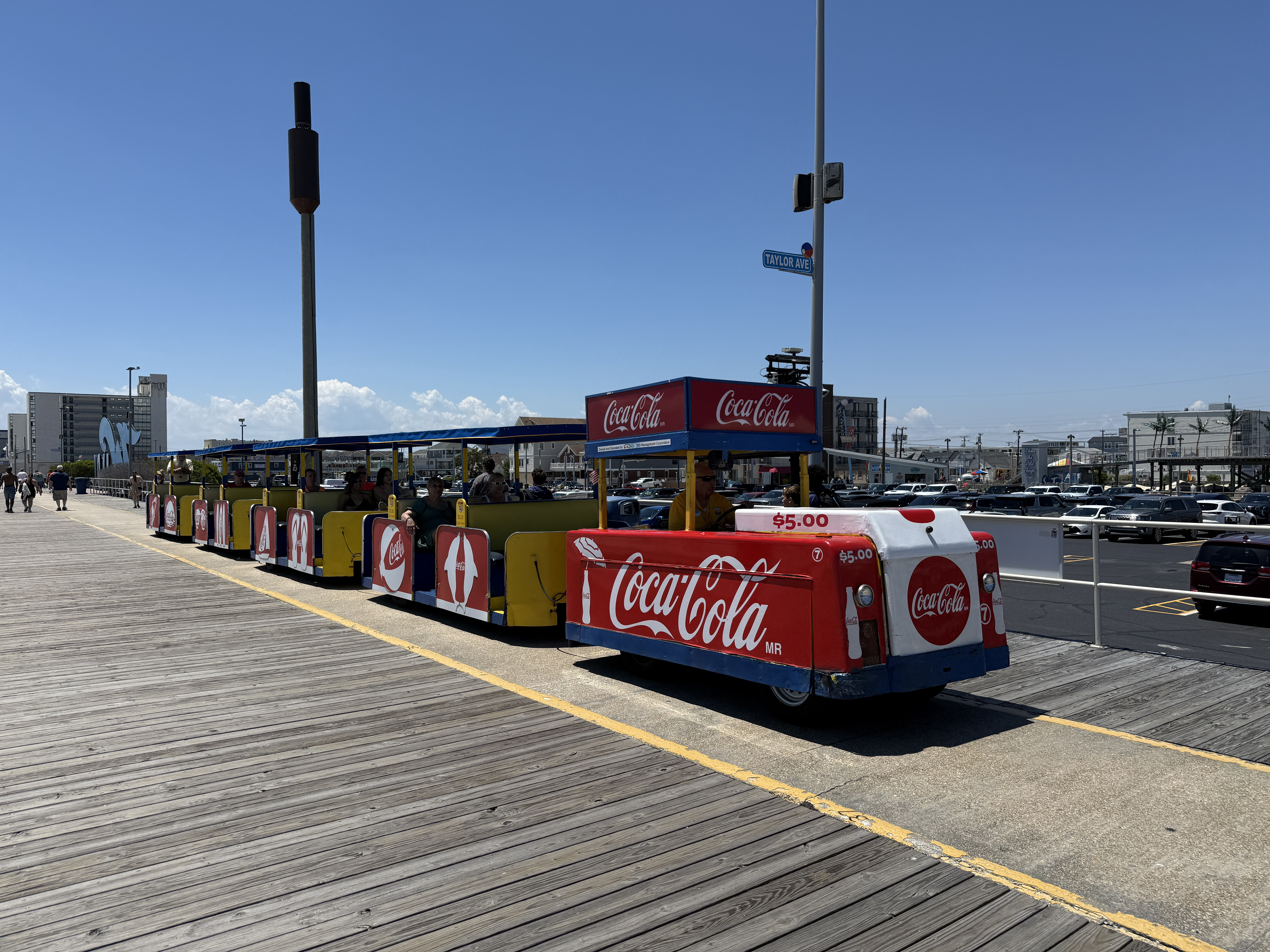
The Tramcar featuring an advertisement for Coca-Cola

The Tramcar is colored yellow and blue, though sometimes contains other colors due to advertisements. It is well known for the phrase "Watch the tramcar, please," a pre-recorded alert voiced by local Floss Stingel in 1971 to clear the tramcar's path. The tramcar fare was $4.00 in 2022, but was increased 25% for the 2023 season to $5.00.

Operating hours are 12:00 p.m. to 11:00 p.m. The Tramcar started running five years after the boardwalk was constructed. The original fare was 10 cents one way. A round-trip tram-car ride takes approximately one hour. Each tram car runs on a 36-volt DC battery that weighs more than 2,000 pounds (910 kg). The batteries are charged each night and can run for about seven or eight hours at a time. Several of the tramcars running on the Boardwalk are the same ones that were built for the 1939 New York World's Fair in New York City. The tramcars carry about half a million people up and down the Boardwalk each year. From 1998 to 2000, Wildwood hosted the annual Great Tramcar Race between entertainers Al Alberts and Cozy Morley.

In 2015, the tramcar’s famous "Watch the Tramcar please" phrase was used on trams on the Atlantic City Boardwalk until a lawsuit was filed. This resulted in the trams receiving the new phrase, "Step aside or enjoy a ride".

On August 9, 2019, the Runaway Tram steel roller coaster opened at Morey's Piers' Surfside Pier on the Wildwood Boardwalk and is modeled after the yellow-and-blue tramcar. On the caboose of the train is a figure in honor of long-tenured tramcar driver, John "Gig" Gigliotti who had been driving the tramcars on the boardwalk for 25 years.

Floss Stingel, who recorded the message warning riders to "Watch the tram car, please" in 1971 to help out a boyfriend, filed suit in October 2024 against the city and its historical museum, claiming that she was never compensated for the widespread use of her recorded voice, which is played thousands of times a day each summer in Wildwood.

Citing expensive repair costs and limited parts for the old vehicles, the city commissioned a Ford Maverick hybrid pickup truck as one of the tramcars, phasing in a new generation of tram cars for the 2025 summer season. The truck will play the same iconic "Watch the Tramcar" message and is painted in the same blue and yellow color scheme. Three New Volvo electric vehicles are expected to be delivered in 2026.
