= Carbon Point =

Carbon Point (57°6′S 26°42′W) is a headland just northwest of Clapmatch Point, near the southwest corner of Candlemas Island, South Sandwich Islands. The name derives from Punta Carbón used in Argentine hydrographic publications as early as 1953.
