= Rollie's Coaster =

Steel roller coaster at Morey's Piers

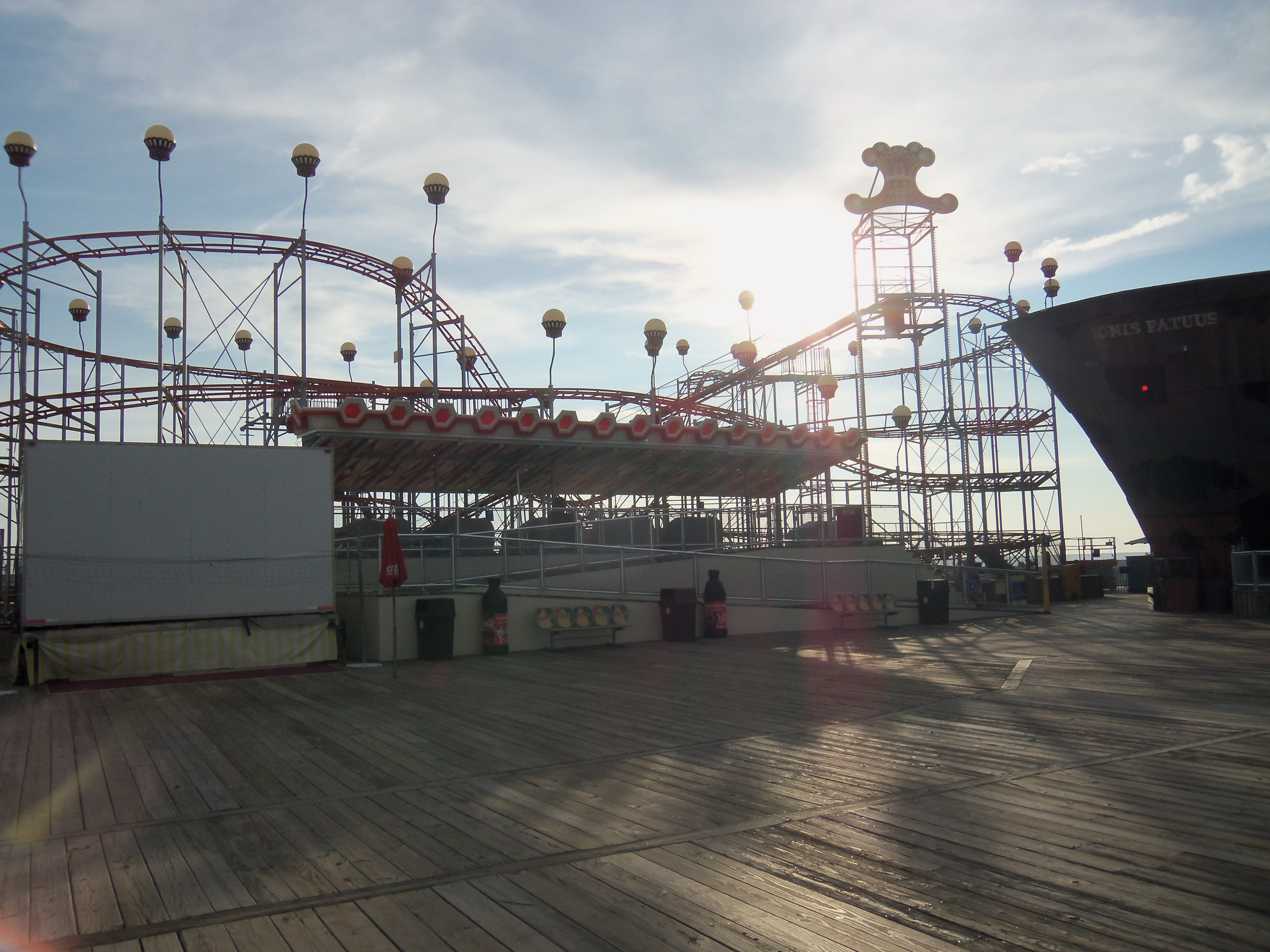
- Rollie's Coaster at dawn

Morey's Piers
- Location: Morey's Piers
- Park section: Mariner's Pier
- Coordinates: 38.9858°N 74.8097°W
- Status: Operating
- Opening date: 1999

General statistics
- Type: Steel
- Manufacturer: Pinfari
- Designer: F.lli Pinfari S.r.l
- Model: Zyklon
- Lift/launch system: Chain lift hill
- Inversions: 0
- Height restriction: 50 in (127 cm)
- Rollie's Coaster at RCDB

Video

Rollie's Coaster is a steel roller coaster in the Mariner's Pier section of Morey's Piers amusement park located in Wildwood, New Jersey. Manufactured by Pinfari, the Zyklon roller coaster model opened to the public in 1999. The ride, which is described as a family coaster, features three hills, a helix, and can accommodate up to four riders per car.

The coaster was described by The Roller Coaster Lover's Companion as having a relatively mild thrill level (2 on a 5-point scale), and it was rated 3 out of 5 five stars for its overall ride quality and experience. The Philadelphia Inquirer mentioned the ride's opening in 1999.
