= Clapmatch Point =

Clapmatch Point (57°6′S 26°39′W) is a low lava point penetrated by narrow clefts, forming the southwest point of Candlemas Island, South Sandwich Islands. The name applied by the UK Antarctic Place-Names Committee in 1971 is a traditional sealers' name for a female fur seal. There is a breeding colony of this animal on the point.

Carbon Point is located just northwest of Clapmatch Point.
