= Clinker Gulch =

Gulch on Candlemas Island, South Sandwich Islands

Clinker Gulch (57°3′S 26°42′W) is a gulch extending from Lucifer Hill to the north shore of Candlemas Island, South Sandwich Islands. The name applied by the UK Antarctic Place-Names Committee in 1971 reflects the actively volcanic, sulphurous nature of the area, and the loose piles of lava debris, resembling furnace clinkers, which wall the gulch.
