= Chimaera Flats =

Beach in the South Sandwich Islands

Chimaera Flats (57°4′S 26°40′W) is a broad stretch of flat sand with a smooth surface only a few metres above sea level, between Medusa Pool and Gorgon Pool on Candlemas Island, South Sandwich Islands. The name applied by the UK Antarctic Place-Names Committee in 1971 refers to the chimaera, a mythical fire-eating monster.
