= Sarcophagus Point =

Sarcophagus Point (57°4′S 26°43′W) is a point at the southeast side of Sea Serpent Cove on the west coast of Candlemas Island, South Sandwich Islands. The point, with a spine of lava cliffs, almost cuts off Medusa Pool from the sea. It was referred to as "The Sarcophagus" on a sketch-survey of Sea Serpent Cove made by a boat party from RRS Discovery II in 1930.
