= Mount Andromeda =

Mount Andromeda can refer to:

- Mount Andromeda (Alberta) in Canada
- Mount Andromeda (South Sandwich Islands) near the South Pole
