= Fun Pier =

Amusement park in Wildwood, New Jersey, U.S.

- Previously known as Kiddieland
- Interactive map of Fun Pier
- Location: Wildwood, New Jersey, U.S.
- Coordinates: 38.9863°N 74.8106°W
- Status: Defunct
- Opened: 1957
- Closed: 1987
- Owner: Joe Barnes
- Operated by: Bill Howard
- General manager: Joe Barnes and Bill Howard
- Slogan: Where the Fun Began
- Later operated as: Wild Wheels, Adventure Pier

Fun Pier is a defunct amusement park that ran from 1957 to 1987 on a pier on the beach in Wildwood, New Jersey.

== History ==
Fun Pier opened up as the Wildwood Convention Hall Pier in 1924 by being leased out by Holly Beach Realty. In 1957, Holly Beach Realty ended their contract with the Wildwood Convention Hall Pier and eventually rented the pier to Joe Barnes, who turned it into Fun Pier. When Barnes first started to rent the pier, he had to destroy the entrance of the Wildwood Convention Hall to accommodate enough room for new rides. The end of the Wildwood Convention Hall, which was an arcade and some shops, was later converted to a dark ride. Eventually by the mid 60's the building was torn down. The pier eventually got a Monorail, Ski Ride, Sky Tower and some other kiddie rides. In 1973, the Seascape ride way redeveloped into Castle Frankenstein. Later in 1975, the Devil's Inn was transformed into Lost World. On November 15, 1976 Joe Barnes sold the pier to the Howard's family. When he came some renovations came to the pier when he got rid of the classic monorail. In the 80's the pier added two water slides, which would last until the final years of the pier. In 1984 there was a fire in the back of the pier (still unknown the cause) which burned Castle Frankenstein to the beach. Later that year on November 24, 1984, the Lost World was completely burned down. This fire also destroyed the Crazy House, Jet 400, and the bumper cars. In 1984 Fun Pier removed the Sky Tower, but the pole would remain on the pier until May 6, 2009. In the 1985 Season the two water slides were removed to make a difference on the pier. Later on that year, Fun Pier would close down. On April 1, 1987 the pier was sold to Morey's Piers. During the 1987 season the Hanneford Family Circus rented the pier.

== The Morey's Era ==
The pier is currently owned by Morey's Piers. The Morey's renamed it to Wild Wheels in the 90's and in 2006 it was once again renamed Adventure Pier.

=== Former rides ===
The pier has had many ride which includes a Helicopter launch, the Cinema 180, a bungee jump, a 4D theater, the Jersey Junkyard, a boat tag game, The Skycoaster, and a small carousel from Chance Rides.

=== Current rides ===
The Great White, the Skyscraper ride, a The Spring Shot ride, a Screamin' Swing, and Grand Prix Raceway
