= Gorgon Pool =

Lake/lagoon

Gorgon Pool (57°4′S 26°41′W) is a lake, or perhaps lagoon, between the Chimaera Flats and Kraken Cove in Candlemas Island, South Sandwich Islands. It was named by the UK Antarctic Place-Names Committee in association with nearby Medusa Pool. The Gorgon is a mythical creature of Homer's Iliad, linked in other mythology with Medusa.
