= Breakbones Plateau =

Small lava plateau on Candlemas Island, South Sandwich Islands

Coordinates: 57°4′S 26°41′W

Breakbones Plateau is a small lava plateau just north of Chimaera Flats on Candlemas Island, South Sandwich Islands. The feature is an interesting biological area containing numerous small fumaroles with attendant vegetation. The name applied by the United Kingdom Antarctic Place-Names Committee in 1971 refers both to the difficulty of travel and to the presence of a large breeding colony of giant petrels (Macronectes giganteus), sometimes known as "breakbones".
