= Tomblin Rock =

Tomblin Rock (57°4′38.8″S 26°41′23.7″W) is an isolated rock 0.6 nautical miles (1.1 km) east-southeast of Demon Point, Candlemas Island, in the South Sandwich Islands. It is 24 meters high. It is more than 50 meters long north–south, and about 23 meters wide. It has an area of less than 0.1 hectares.

It was charted and named Black Rock by personnel on RRS Discovery II in 1930, but that name was changed to avoid duplication. Renamed by United Kingdom Antarctic Place-Names Committee (UK-APC) in 1971 for John F. Tomblin, British Antarctic Survey (BAS) geologist who made a detailed study of rocks at Candlemas Island in 1964.
