= Sarcophagus (disambiguation) =

A sarcophagus is a funeral receptacle for a corpse.

Sarcophagus may also refer to:

- "Sarcophagus" (The Outer Limits), a television episode
- Chernobyl Nuclear Power Plant sarcophagus, a concrete structure erected after the Chernobyl disaster
- Sarcophagus Point, a headland in the South Sandwich Islands
- Sarcophagus Pond, Antarctica

== See also ==
- Sarcophagidae, a family of flies commonly known as flesh flies
  - Sarcophaga, a genus known as common flesh flies
- Sarcofagus, a Finnish heavy metal band
