= Lucifer Hill =

Hill in Antarctica

Coordinates: 57°4′S 26°42′W

Lucifer Hill is a reddish, cindery, sulphur-streaked hill forming the summit of the northern section of Candlemas Island in the South Sandwich Islands. It was one of the most active volcanic vents in this island chain at the time of HMS Protector's survey in 1964. The name applied by the UK Antarctic Place-Names Committee after Lucifer refers to the diabolical and infernal mythical association of active volcanoes. Clinker Gulch extends from Lucifer Hill to the northern shore of Candlemas.
