= Jumbo Jet (Morey's Piers) =

Defunct steel roller coaster

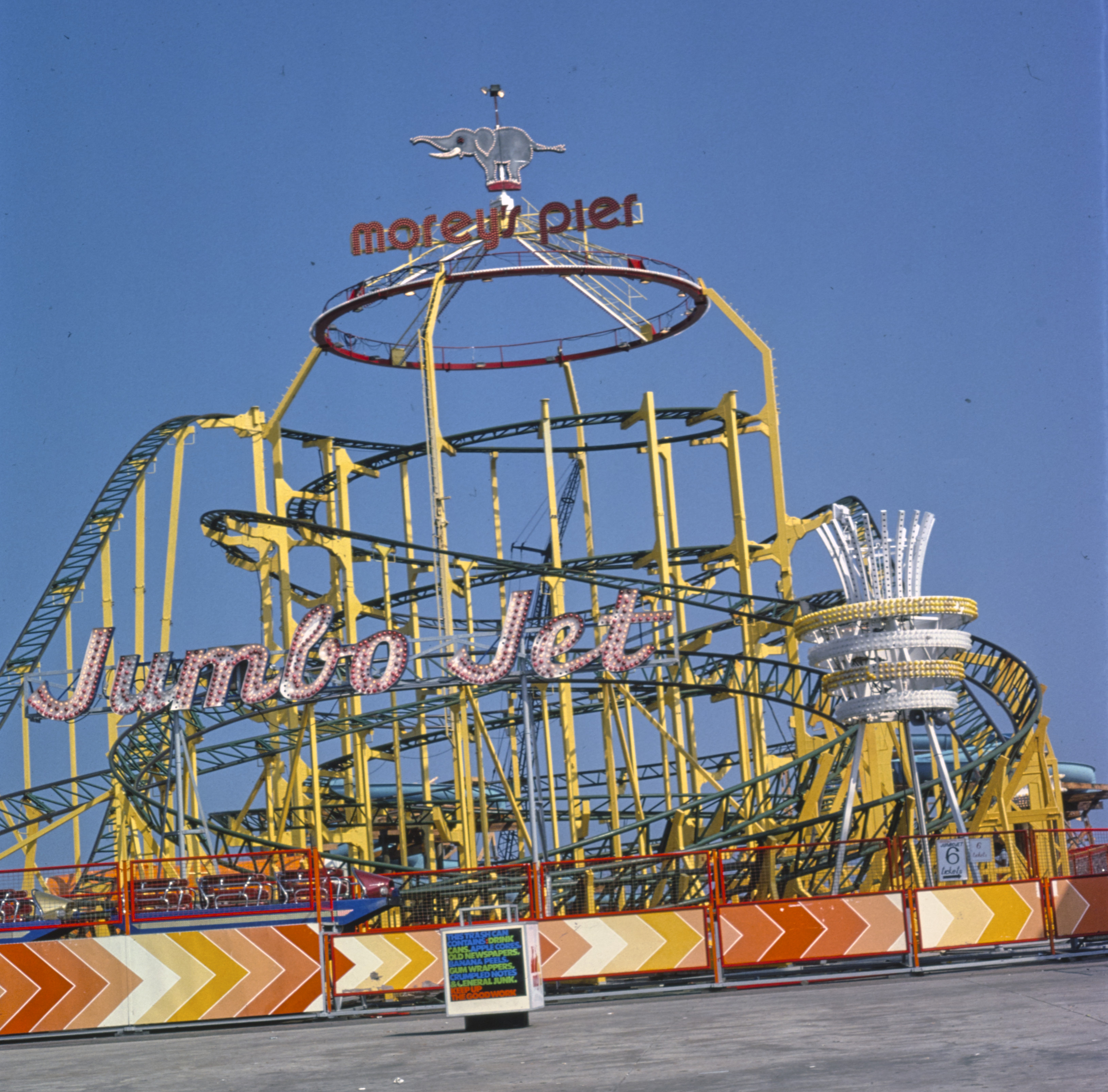
- Jumbo Jet

Morey's Piers
- Location: Morey's Piers
- Coordinates: 38.986°N 74.809°W
- Status: Removed
- Opening date: 1976
- Closing date: 1987
- Cost: $400,000
- Replaced by: Jet Star

General statistics
- Type: Steel
- Manufacturer: Anton Schwarzkopf
- Designer: Ing.-Büro Stengel GmbH
- Model: Jet Star 3 / Jumbo Jet
- Lift/launch system: Electric spiral lift
- Height: 56 ft (17 m)
- Length: 2,854 ft (870 m)
- Speed: 50 mph (80 km/h)
- Inversions: 0
- Duration: 2:23
- Capacity: 1,200 riders per hour
- Jumbo Jet at RCDB

The Jumbo Jet was a prefabricated steel roller coaster at Morey's Piers in Wildwood, New Jersey. Jumbo Jet was a Jet Star 3 / Jumbo Jet model coaster built by noted roller coaster designer Anton Schwarzkopf. In 1975, the Morey brothers traveled to Germany and purchased the Jumbo Jet for $400,000. Morey's Surfside Pier had to be extended a total of 250 feet (76 m) to make room for the Jumbo Jet. Despite the expense, however, Jumbo Jet became one of the most popular roller coasters on the Jersey Shore, and was credited for increasing attendance at Morey's Piers. It was the second and final Jet Star 3 / Jumbo Jet model coaster to be built in the state of New Jersey.

Although multiple sources support the purchase of the Morey's Piers Jumbo Jet as occurring in Germany, some sources persist in the rumor that this coaster may have been the relocation of the ill-fated Jumbo Jet from Great Adventure (now Six Flags Great Adventure).

Regardless of the ride's origins, Jumbo Jet was sold in 1987 to a German broker. It was rumored that the broker traded the coaster to Gorky Park in Moscow for two railroad cars of ketchup, as the ruble was not a widely accepted currency outside of the Soviet Union at the time. The coaster was actually sold to Alton Towers, which operated from 1988 to 1997 before ending up in Mexico and Colombia, where it last operated in 2017.

== Ride layout ==
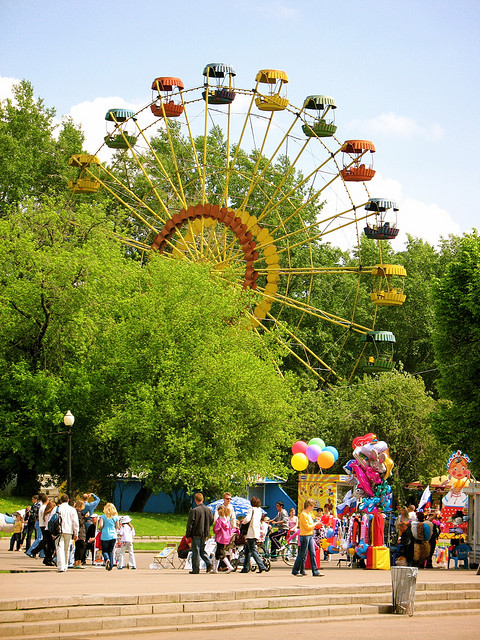
Gorky Park, where Jumbo Jet was rumored to be sold

Like other coasters of the Jet Star 3 / Jumbo Jet model line, the Jumbo Jet did not utilize a chain lift or launch mechanism to reach the top of the lift hill. Instead, small wheel motors drove it up the incline of a tight helix. The track was also different on Jet Star 3 / Jumbo Jet roller coasters than on most later steel roller coasters. The former has much thinner track rails than the tubular steel of the latter. Riders on the Morey's Piers Jumbo Jet cited its high-speed, banking turns as a noteworthy element.

== See also ==
- Jumbo Jet (Cedar Point)
