= Mount Perseus =

Mountain in the South Sandwich Islands

Mount Perseus (57°4′S 26°40′W) is the lower (455 m) and more northerly of twin ice domes in the east part of Candlemas Island, South Sandwich Islands. Named by United Kingdom Antarctic Place-Names Committee (UK-APC) in 1971 in association with nearby Mount Andromeda. In Greek mythology, Perseus married Andromeda after rescuing her from a sea monster.
