= Cozy Morley =

American singer-songwriter, entertainer and comedian

Thomas Francis "Cozy" Morley
- Born: 1926; South Philadelphia, Pennsylvania, US
- Died: August 23, 2013 (aged 86–87); Camden, New Jersey, US
- Occupations: singer-songwriter, entertainer

Thomas Francis "Cozy" Morley (c. 1926 – August 23, 2013) was an American singer-songwriter, entertainer, comedian and club owner, best known for his rendition of "On the Way to Cape May", which became his signature song.

Raised in South Philadelphia, Morley attended Southeast Catholic High School. He started with the banjo and added the clarinet and saxophone to his repertoire. Morley credited the broad diversity of his neighborhood for the breadth of cultural references in his humor, though in his later years he recognized that some of the jokes he had told were no longer "politically correct".

The nickname "Cozy" came because he looked like he could be the younger brother of an entertainer named Cozy Dolan. He was described by The New York Times as having been a "South Jersey Shore institution" starting from the time when he was first discovered in 1949 and brought to the attention of Ed Suez, who owned a club in North Wildwood, New Jersey and hired him as an opening act; building on his success as a performer, Morley bought the club from Suez in 1958 for $10,000. Though he didn't create the song, Morley helped popularize the song "On the Way to Cape May," a song that became Morely's signature song, chronicling the places encountered along the route.

A statue of Morley stands at the former site of Club Avalon in North Wildwood, which he owned and operated until 1989, when the city condemned the building. He attracted crowds as large as 1,200 to his club. The city's mayor called him "Mr. North Wildwood". After his club closed, Morley performed frequently in Atlantic City.

In the late 1990s, Morley competed in an annual Tramcar Race as a fundraiser on the Wildwood / North Wildwood boardwalk against entertainer Al Alberts.

He wrote a song called "It's New Jersey", which he unsuccessfully promoted for acceptance as the official state song. In 2003, New Jersey State Senators James Cafiero and Stephen M. Sweeney, both from South Jersey, introduced legislation that would make Morley's song "It's New Jersey" one of six official state songs.

A longtime resident of Haddon Township, New Jersey, Morley also owned homes in North Wildwood and in Fort Lauderdale, Florida. Morley died on August 23, 2013, at a hospital in Camden. The cause of death was complications related to diabetes.

Morley was inducted into the Broadcast Pioneers of Philadelphia Hall of Fame in 2015.
