= Sea Serpent Cove =

Sea Serpent Cove (57°2′S 26°42′W) is a small cove 1 nautical mile (1.9 km) southeast of Vulcan Point on the west side of Candlemas Island, in the South Sandwich Islands. Charted and named in 1930 by DI personnel on the Discovery II.

Sarcophagus Point lies at the southeast side of the cove.
