= Ignis Fatuus =

Horror attraction at Morey's Piers

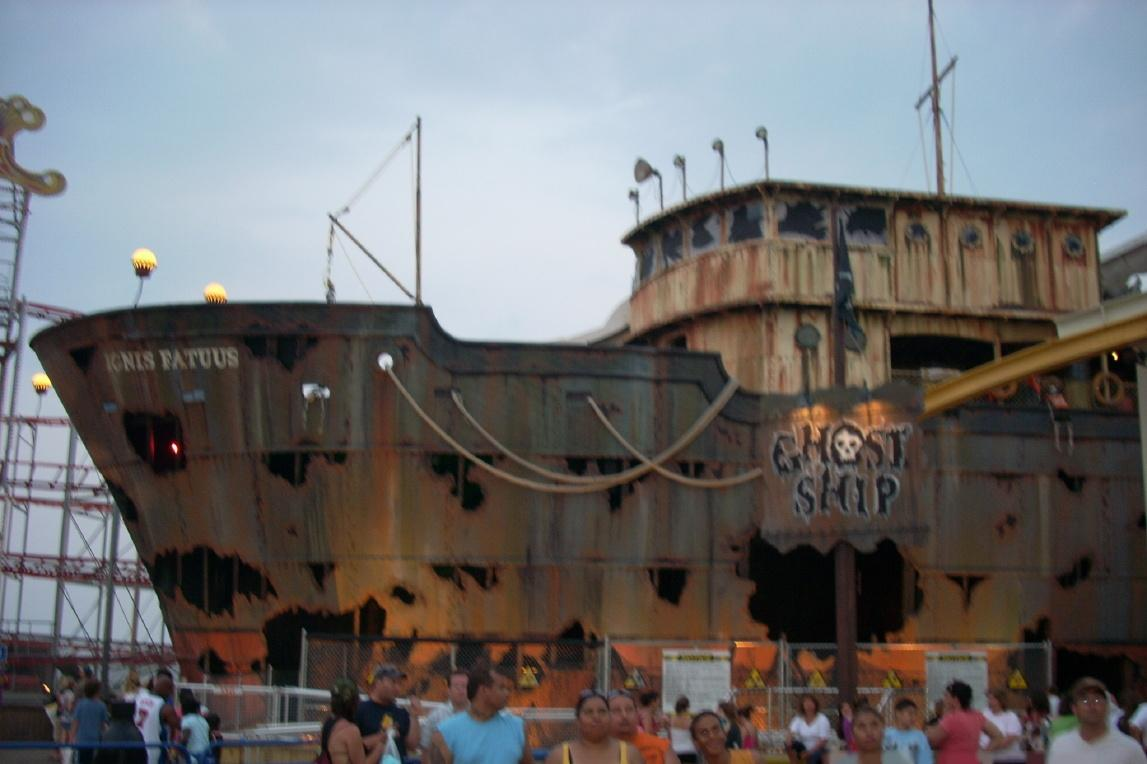

Morey's Piers
- Status: Operating
- Cost: 3,000,000 USD
- Opening date: 2010

Ride statistics
- Attraction type: Haunted attraction
- Manufacturer: Morey's Piers
- Speed: 4 mph (6.4 km/h)
- Vehicles: 4-5 groups (walk-through)
- Riders per vehicle: around 10
- Duration: 15-20 minutes

Ignis Fatuus, or Ghost Ship, is a walk-through horror attraction on the Mariner's Landing Pier at Morey's Piers amusement park located in Wildwood, New Jersey. It is the most recent and only attraction that uses real actors within it, has spectators walk around the attraction. It covers 15,000 square feet (1,400 m^{2}) of the pier, and lasts 15 minutes; making one of the biggest and longest running attractions in the park. The ride is intended for kids 10 and up due to its intensity; such as grotesque medical experiments, blood, radiation scars, facial deformities, and the involvement of a claustrophobia room. While a strict no running policy is enforced, the attraction does have a series of "sissy exits" placed throughout the attraction if the ride becomes too intense.

== Story ==
The story goes that the Ignis Fatuus was a second participant in the Philadelphia project, a military experiment located at a Philadelphia Naval Ship Yard at Philadelphia Pennsylvania. While in the experiment, the Ignis Fatuus left Philadelphia without another word. Then the ship sailed down the Delaware River in order to get to the Atlantic Ocean. In 1942, during her voyage, a storm was formed in the middle of the Atlantic, causing the ship to sink. It has been said that the ship sunk with a "cargo of questionable goods hidden in the hold".

A little less than seventy years later, this great ship washed up on the beach right outside of Morey's Pier. In the first few months of operation the park had a "live press conference" announcing the refurbishment of the ship. This so-called refurbishment is called into doubt immediately as the ship has huge gashes ripped into the metal. Throughout the performance it was established that the restoration of this ship was questionable due in part to the strange captain. The presence of NAPS (the North Atlantic Paranormal Society) cast further doubt upon the legitimacy of this ship's renovations. Through a few more dialog bits, the presence of toxic and nuclear wastes is revealed, and according to NAPS, top secret atomic experiments were taken aboard. The captain then invites guests to tour his vessel before the re-launching celebration. While in line, tension builds as the ship is heard groaning and creaking. Once in the ride it is clear that the undead captain has double crossed his guests and now they must find their way out of the ship. As the story unfolds, it seems that the wastes have had a bigger part to play in the original mystery. The combined effects of the wastes have caused the original crew to mutate into either fully dead or half-dead monstrosities, effectively trapping their souls on this barge forever. Visitors will be forced to walk through many rooms such as the crew quarters and the communications room, while being victims of a spectral onslaught.

In the 2011 re-interpretation, the captain part in this story has been reduced to an on-board scare instead of a villain. There is more emphasis on NAPS and escaping the ship. The human characters have been removed in favor of a fully half dead and mutated crew. The German that was spoken by the crew to add a sense of mystery was completely removed.
