= Runaway Tram =

Steel roller coaster at Morey's Piers

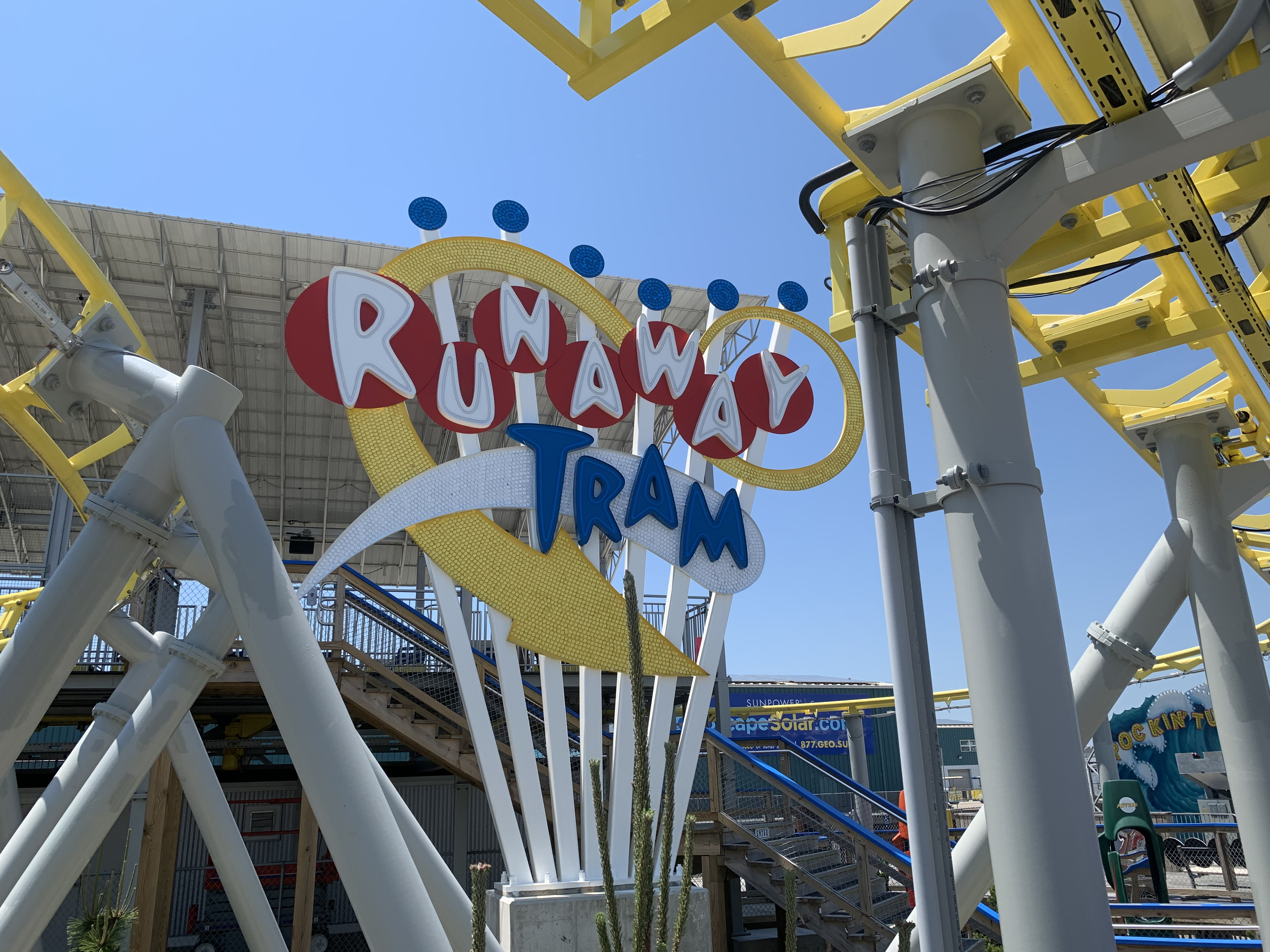

Morey's Piers
- Location: Morey's Piers
- Park section: Surfside Pier
- Coordinates: 38.989431°N 74.803422°W
- Status: Operating
- Opening date: August 9, 2019; 5 years ago
- Cost: $4,000,000
- Replaced: Flitzer, Formula One Raceway

General statistics
- Type: Steel – Family
- Manufacturer: Zierer
- Model: Force - 281
- Lift/launch system: Drive tire
- Height: 36.1 ft (11.0 m)
- Length: 921.9 ft (281.0 m)
- Speed: 28.6 mph (46.0 km/h)
- Inversions: 0
- Capacity: 600 riders per hour
- Height restriction: 40 in (102 cm)
- Trains: Single train with 10 cars. Riders are arranged 2 across in a single row for a total of 20 riders per train.
- Website: Official website
- Runaway Tram at RCDB

Runaway Tram is a steel family roller coaster located on Morey's Piers' Surfside Pier in North Wildwood, New Jersey. The attraction replaced the aging Flitzer roller coaster and required the reconfiguration of several rides on the pier and represented a total investment of $4 million. Runaway Tram spoofs the Wildwood Sightseer Tramcar, a local yellow-and-blue trackless train service.

== History ==
In September 2018, the Morey family announced that the iconic Flitzer on the Surfside Pier would be retired. Over the years, the aging coaster - which was manufactured in 1969 and opened at the park in 1983 - had undergone numerous refurbishments in order to extend its lifetime, but recent evaluations of the attraction determined that it was simply too old to continue operating safely. The Flitzer had its final day of operation on September 30, 2018, although the park assured that a new coaster was among the plans laid out to replace it.

Preparation began in October 2018, when the Flitzer, Doo Wopper wild mouse coaster, and other attractions were dismantled. The Formula One Raceway, a dormant go-kart track that had closed in 2016 and was located underneath the pier, was also gutted. On January 10, 2019, Morey's Piers formally announced the Runaway Tram coaster as the Flitzer's replacement, which would debut in time for the park's 50th anniversary and require the reconfiguration of seven existing attractions, including the Doo Wopper. Part of the pier was removed and footers poured into the ground below in April 2019, on space formerly occupied by the Raceway. Runaway Tram began vertical construction shortly afterwards, and the coaster train arrived on May 8, 2019.

Runaway Tram first began testing on June 17, 2019. The coaster was originally intended to open on July 2, 2019, in time for the 4th of July long weekend, but an unprecedentedly slow approval process delayed its opening. Once the state signed off on the attraction, Runaway Tram opened to the public on August 9, 2019.

== Characteristics ==
=== Statistics ===
Runaway Tram is 36 feet (11 m) tall, 922 feet (281 m) long, and reaches speeds of up to 28.6 mph (46.0 km/h). The coaster runs a single 10 car train, each car of seats 2 riders in a single row for a total occupancy of 20 riders. In addition, the coaster occupies a 194.6' x 87.9' site. The ride's track is supported by 118 support columns.

=== Model ===
Runaway Tram was manufactured by Zierer, and is one of their Force models. The layout is that of the Force 281 variant, which is composed of a single booster wheel lift hill and helix, as well as various twists and turns. As of 2021, only four of the 281 variant have been built, including Flight School (2019) at Emerald Park in Ireland and Flyvende Ørn (2018) at Legoland Billund Resort in Denmark. The latter coaster served as a direct influence for Runaway Tram's installation, as Morey's representatives had ridden it during a Scandinavia business trip in 2018 and felt that the attraction was the correct fit for their park.

=== Theme ===
Runaway Tram's train is modeled after the local Wildwood Sightseer Tramcar, a trackless train that runs along the Wildwood Boardwalk. The service was originally built for the 1939 New York World's Fair before debuting on the Wildwood Boardwalk in June 1949. Runaway Tram's themed train and station were designed by Cincinnati-based creative firm JRA while the custom LED signage was designed and manufactured by local firm A.B.S. Sign Company.
