= The Great White (Morey's Piers) =

Roller coaster

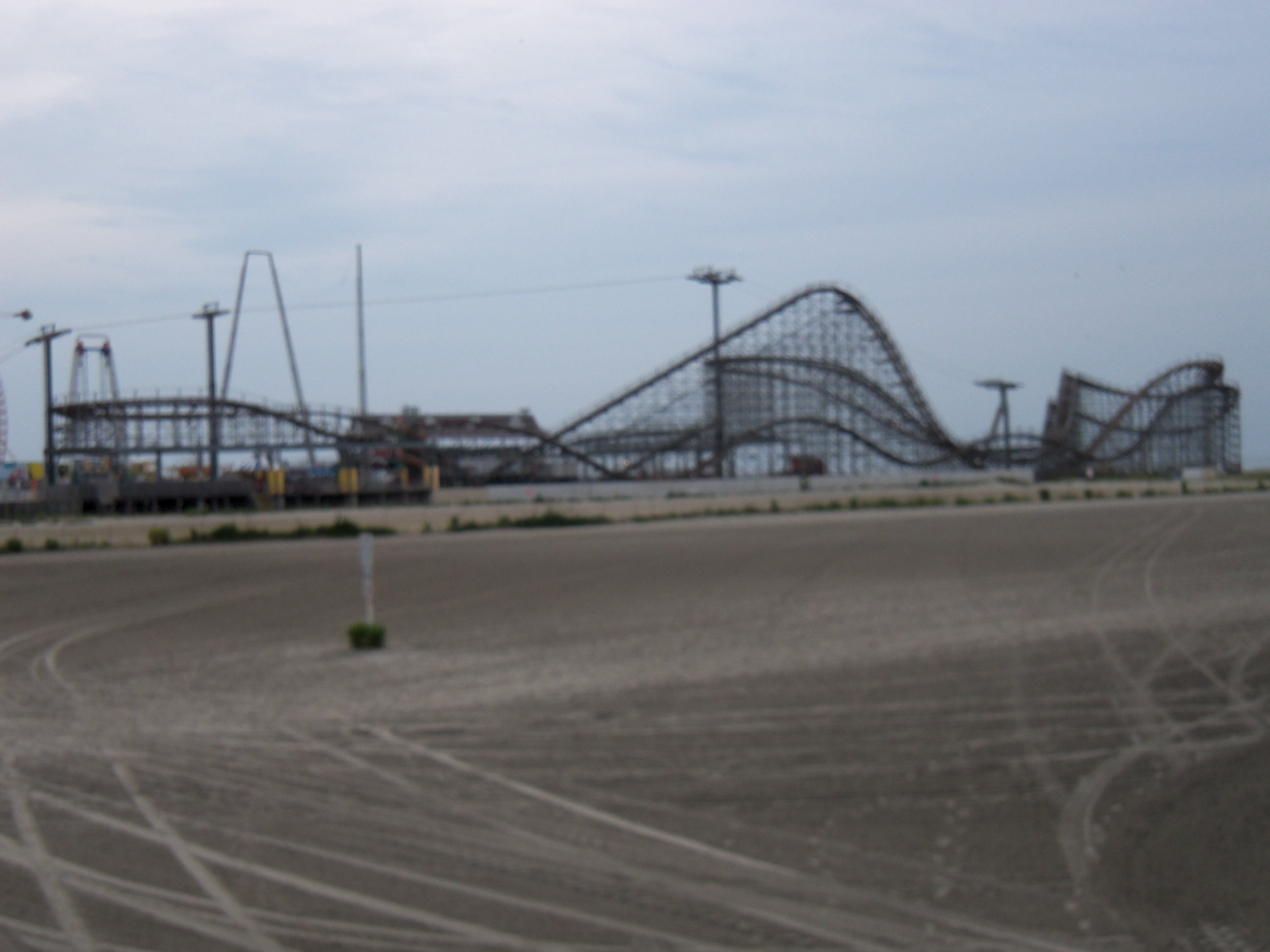
- The Great White taken from boardwalk

Morey's Piers
- Location: Morey's Piers
- Park section: Adventure Pier
- Coordinates: 38.98654°N 74.81073°W
- Status: Operating
- Opening date: June 10, 1996
- Cost: $5,500,000 USD

General statistics
- Type: Wood
- Manufacturer: Custom Coasters International
- Designer: Dennis McNulty
- Lift/launch system: Chain lift
- Height: 110 ft (34 m)
- Drop: 100 ft (30 m)
- Length: 3,300 ft (1,000 m)
- Speed: 50 mph (80 km/h)
- Inversions: 0
- Duration: 2:00
- Max vertical angle: 50°
- Capacity: 1200 riders per hour
- Height restriction: 48 in (122 cm)
- Trains: 2 trains with 6 cars; riders arranged 2 across in 2 rows for a total of 24 riders per train
- The Great White at RCDB

The Great White is a sit-down wooden/steel roller coaster made and built by Custom Coasters International.

It first opened on June 10, 1996 with 2 trains from the Philadelphia Toboggan Company. The original trains were replaced by GCI Millennium Flyer trains for the 2025 season. Riders are arranged 2 across in 12 rows for a total of 24 riders per train.

The ride starts by dropping into a tunnel beneath the boardwalk. After exiting the tunnel, the ride climbs up the 110-foot lift hill before dropping 100 feet at a 50-degree-angle, reaching a maximum speed of 50 mph (80 km/h). The ride then goes off the boardwalk and towards the beach, entering an elevated 225° swooping turn over the beach. The track then dives down into a turning drop, rising up to a flat 225° turn around. Another diving and swooping turn brings the train parallel to the first turn, and thence parallel to the lift hill. A series of three short airtime hills provide strong pops of ejector airtime, before rising up into a double-up into another flat turn around. The train makes one final turning drop and 90° before entering the brake run perpendicular to the lift hill and station.

This ride was built over the beach because Morey's Piers ran out of room on the pier. This ride is being constantly checked out by inspectors and has its track replaced frequently. This is one of the three 100+ feet coasters at Morey's and the only one that is a hybrid coaster. The ride has been retracked by Martin & Vleminckx.

For 2021, the coaster received 240 feet of new track, a new ride control system, and an elevator in the station. The coaster's original PTC trains were replaced with GCI Millennium Flyer trains for the 2025 season.
