= Medusa Pool =

Tidal lagoon in the South Sandwich Islands

Medusa Pool (57°4′S 26°42′W) is a tidal lagoon that occupies the west side of the central lowlands of Candlemas Island in the South Sandwich Islands. The name, given by the UK Antarctic Place-Names Committee in 1971, is associated in classical mythology with the geomorphologically similar Gorgon Pool nearby, Medusa being one of the gorgons.
