= Mount Andromeda (South Sandwich Islands) =

Mountain in the South Sandwich Islands

Highest point
- Elevation: 550 m (1,800 ft)
- Prominence: 550 m (1,800 ft)
- Coordinates: 57°5′S 26°39′W

Geography
- Location: Candlemas Island, South Sandwich Islands

Mount Andromeda is, at 550 metres (1,800 ft), the higher and more southerly of the twin ice domes, this one marking the summit of Candlemas Island, South Sandwich Islands. It was named by the United Kingdom Antarctic Place-Names Committee in 1971 in association with nearby Mount Perseus, the name referring to Andromeda, the mythical heroine rescued from a sea monster by the hero Perseus.
