= Demon Point =

Demon Point (57°3′S 26°40′W) is a spit of coarse boulders which forms the northeast tip of Candlemas Island, South Sandwich Islands. It was charted and named "Spit Point" by personnel of the RRS Discovery II in 1930, but that name was changed to avoid duplication. The new name applied by the UK Antarctic Place-Names Committee in 1971 continues a theme of features named after mythical monsters on this island.
