= Sea Serpent (Morey's Piers) =

Steel roller coaster

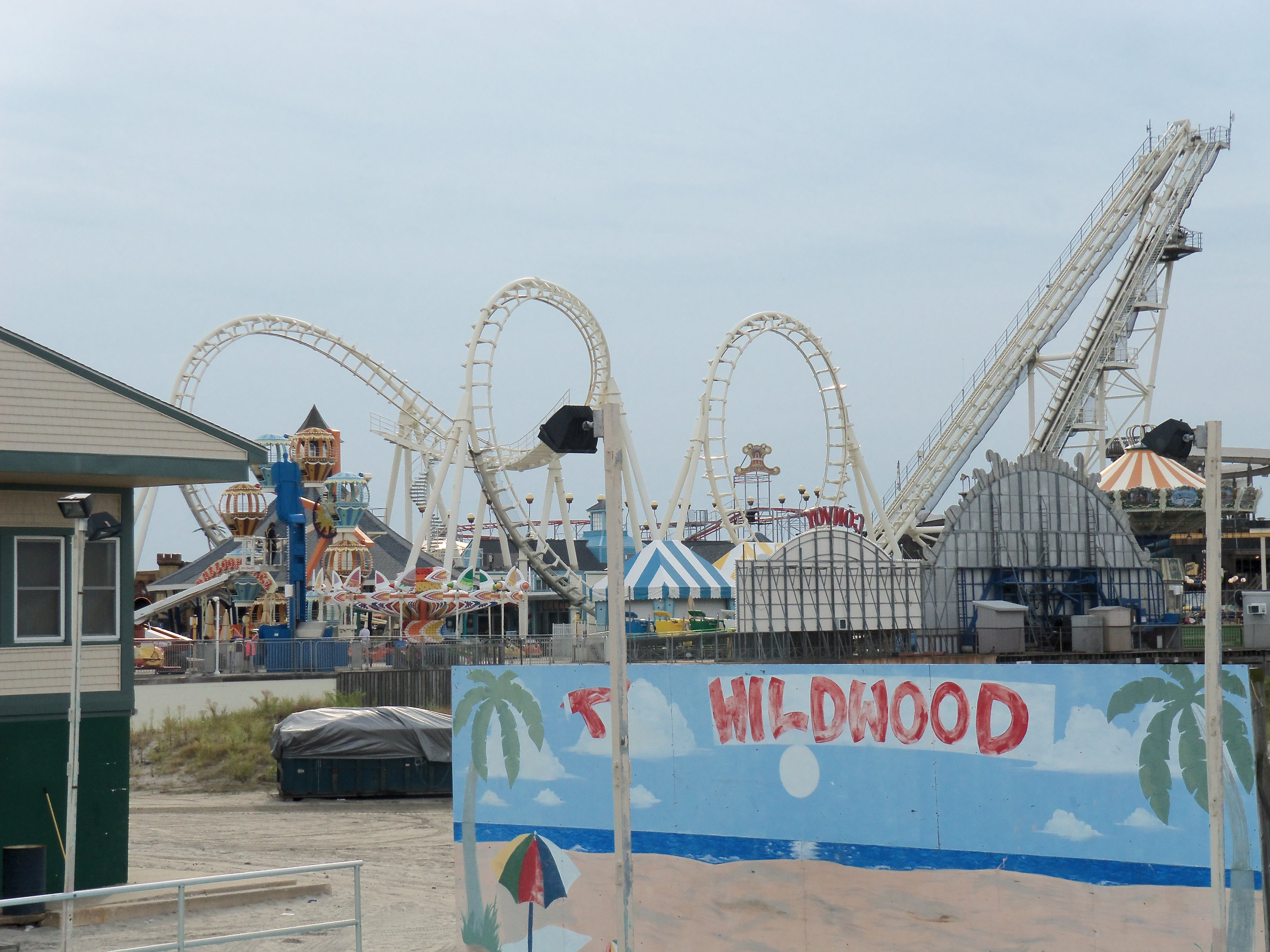
- Sea Serpent taken from boardwalk

Morey's Piers
- Location: Morey's Piers
- Park section: Mariner's Landing Pier
- Coordinates: 38.9858°N 74.8097°W
- Status: Operating
- Opening date: June 27 1984
- Cost: $1,500,000 USD

General statistics
- Type: Steel – Shuttle
- Manufacturer: Vekoma
- Designer: Vekoma
- Model: Boomerang
- Track layout: Boomerang
- Lift/launch system: Cable lift hill
- Height: 125 ft (38 m)
- Drop: 116.5 ft (35.5 m)
- Length: 935 ft (285 m)
- Speed: 47 mph (76 km/h)
- Inversions: 3
- Duration: 1:48
- Capacity: 760 riders per hour
- G-force: 5.2
- Height restriction: 48 in (122 cm)
- Trains: Single train with 7 cars; riders arranged 2 across in 2 rows for a total of 28 riders per train
- Sea Serpent at RCDB

Video

Sea Serpent is a steel roller coaster at Morey's Piers in Wildwood, New Jersey. Opened in 1984, it was built by Vekoma, and was the first boomerang-style coaster to be built in the US. The coaster's installation was part of a redevelopment of the Marine Pier into a new Mariner's Landing area in 1984. The Sea Serpent currently sits in the middle of Mariners Landing and serves as an icon for the pier along with The Giant Wheel.

Riders board yellow, orange and green trains to go with the theme. It is a single train with seven cars. Riders are arranged two across in two rows for a total of 28 riders. The train begins its backwards climb up the first of the ride's two 116 foot lift hills, both of which are placed diagonally towards each other. The train continues to slowly rise for thirty seconds before dropping at forty-seven miles per hour right through the station and through the coaster's first inversion, a Cobra Roll, exerting as many as 5.2 g's on riders throughout the two elements. The train then goes through a Loop before ending up on the second lift section. The second lift pulls riders upwards for a few seconds, then releases, sending riders backwards. The train encounters the loop first this time, only to then go through the cobra roll once again which leads riders back through the station and partially up the first lift section again. The train then slowly lowers back down into the station, having sent riders through 935 feet of three inversions in total, both forwards and backwards.

During the 2019-2020 off season, the ride underwent a makeover, which includes replacing the second lift hill, brakes, and the trains.

== 1998 incident ==
Sea Serpent accident
- Date: June 28, 1998
- Deaths: 0
- Injuries: 14

In June 1998 the coaster suffered its first ever accident, injuring 14 of the 23 riders on board, some of whom were stranded upside down. According to Will Morey, chief executive officer of the Morey Organization, the accident was thought to have been due to a wheel coming off a rear axle, causing the coaster train to jerk to a stop midway through the ride, as it was looping backwards. A less serious incident trapped all 28 riders for four hours in 1984, just two weeks after the ride was installed, after an operator mistakenly engaged a braking system though no serious injuries were reported.
