= Morey's Piers =

Amusement park in New Jersey

Morey's Piers & Beachfront Waterparks
- Previously known as Wilbert Morey, Bill Morey
- Interactive map of Morey's Piers & Beachfront Waterparks
- Location: 3501 Boardwalk, Wildwood & North Wildwood, New Jersey, U.S.
- Coordinates: 38.98557°N 74.80932°W
- Status: Operating
- Opened: 1969
- Owner: Wilbert Morey II
- Slogan: America's Boardwalk
- Operating season: April – October (rides and piers); May – September (waterparks)
- Website: www.moreyspiers.com

Morey's Piers & Beachfront Waterparks is a seaside amusement park located on The Wildwoods' boardwalk in Wildwood and North Wildwood, New Jersey. The park has been family owned and operated since 1969 and was run by second generation Morey Brothers, Will and Jack. Morey's Piers has more than 100 rides and attractions across its three amusement piers and two beachfront waterparks.

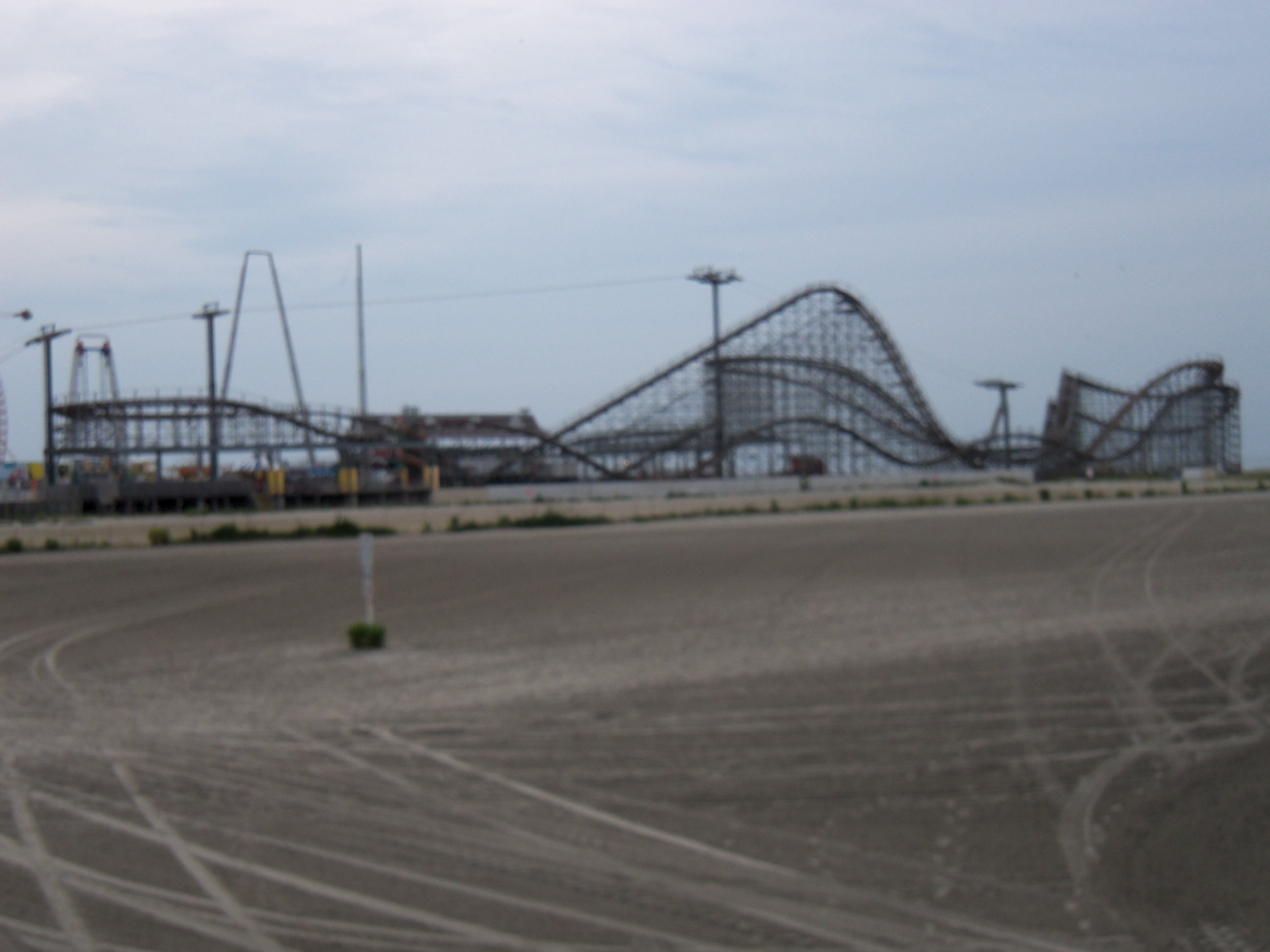
Great White

== Description ==
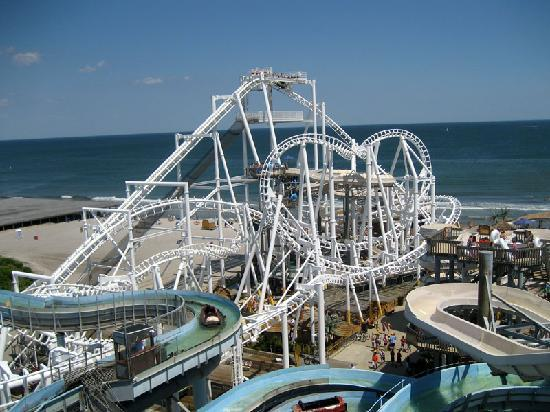
The Great Nor'easter

=== Surfside Pier ===
Surfside Pier is located at 25th Avenue, in North Wildwood. It was the first of the three piers, opening in 1969 with a giant fiberglass slide that cost 25 cents to ride. The slide was closed at the end of the 2010 season and refurbished as a waterslide at the pier's water park, Ocean Oasis. Surfside Pier includes the Zoom Phloom, AtmosFEAR, The Great Nor'easter, and Runaway Tram.

=== Mariner's Pier ===
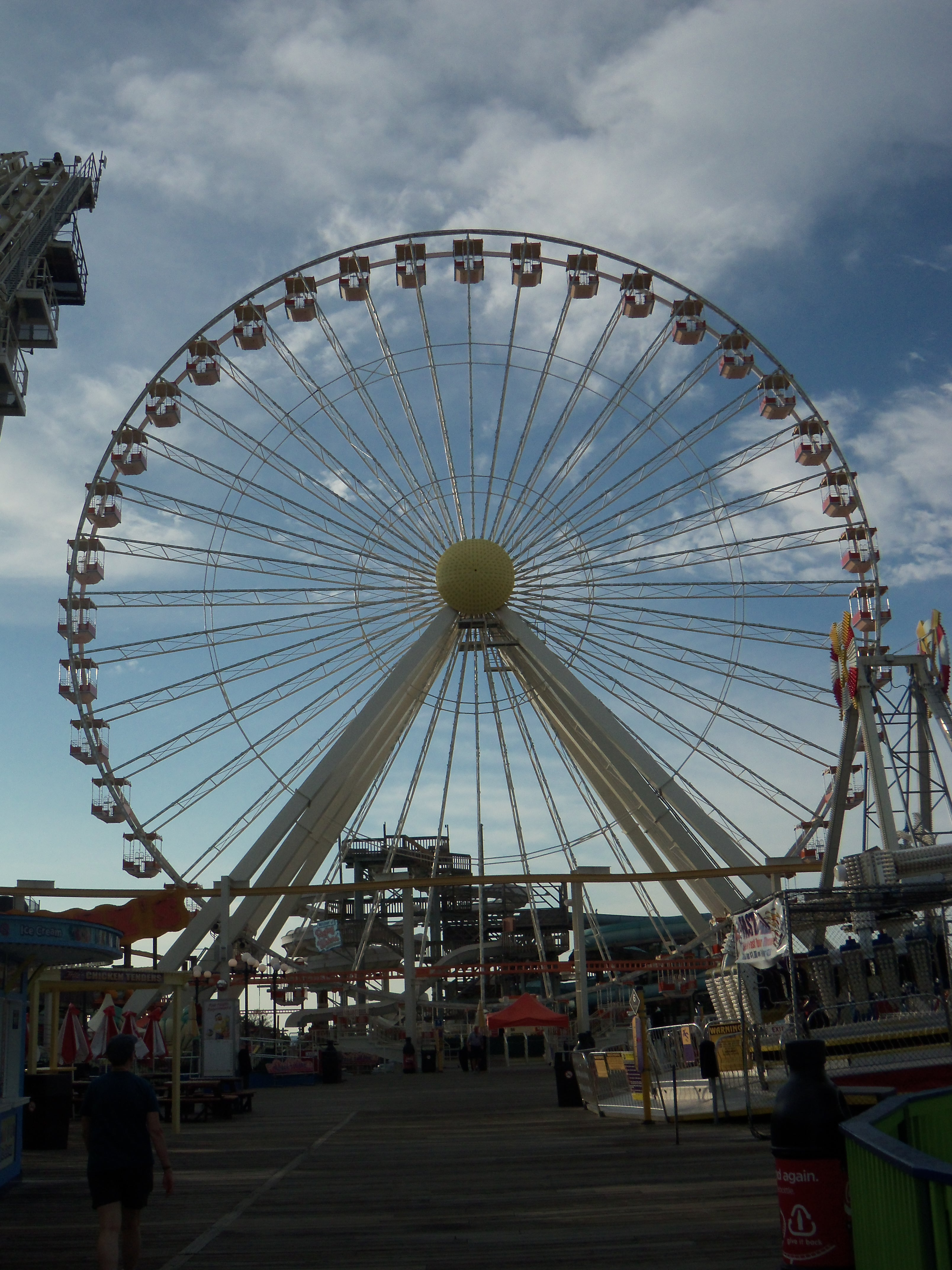
Giant Wheel

Mariner's Pier, located at Schellenger Avenue in Wildwood, is like a traditional amusement park, with classics like the Super Scooters, Teacups, Musik Express, Ignis Fatuus, Sea Serpent and the Giant Wheel, a 156-foot (47.5 m) tall Ferris wheel built by Vekoma, which opened in 1985. In the early mornings of the summer, breakfast can be eaten on the wheel. In June 2011, 11-year-old Abiah Jones died after falling from the Giant Wheel. Since then, a "no single riders" policy was created for when guests ride the ferris wheel to ensure the safety of the guests.

=== Adventure Pier ===
Adventure Pier, located at Spencer Avenue, includes Grand Prix Raceway and the famous wooden coaster The Great White, the Skyscraper ride, a Spring Shot ride, a Screamin' Swing, helicopter tours, and various shops and eateries.

=== Ocean Oasis Water Park + Beach Club ===
Ocean Oasis Water Park + Beach Club is on the beach behind Surfside Pier. It includes water slides, a lazy river, a hot tub with bar access and a kids area.

=== Raging Waters Water Park ===
Behind Mariner's Landing is Raging Waters Water Park. It includes two unique kiddie play areas at Shipwreck Shoals and Camp KidTastrophe along with speed slides, a lazy river, Shotgun Falls and an activity pool full of challenges.

== History ==
=== Surfside Pier ===
In 1969, Bill and Will Morey Sr. purchased two lots of boardwalk in North Wildwood at 25th and 26th streets. They called it Morey's Pier and opened that summer with a giant fiberglass slide called the Wipe Out. Guests paid 25 cents to slide down the ride in burlap sacks. Sometime in the mid-2000s, what was referred to as Morey's Pier was rebranded Surfside Pier by management and continues to go by that name to this day.

=== Mariner’s Pier ===
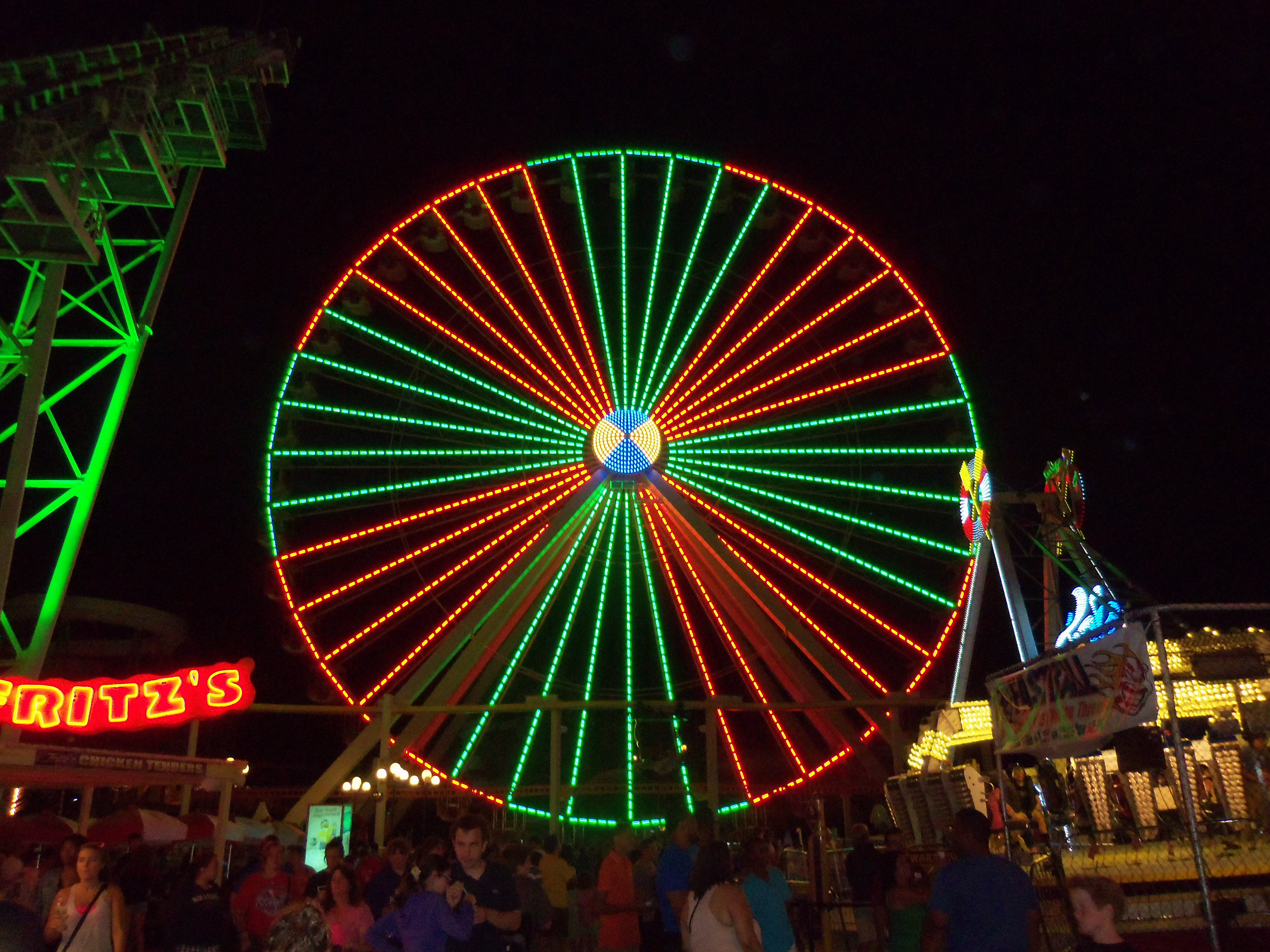
Giant Wheel at night

The Moreys extended their operation in 1976 when they purchased Marine Pier and renamed it Mariner's Landing. At the time of purchase, the pier was fire-damaged and seven of the existing 12 rides on the pier had to be thrown away. However, the pier kept growing. In 1984, the Moreys purchased the Sea Serpent roller coaster. The late-2010s brought new attractions to the pier, such as a permanent biergarten, a new family friendly rollercoaster called “The Wild Whizzer” and the renaming of Mariner's Landing to Mariner's Pier. The new branding is now being used by Morey's Pier Management.

=== Raging Waters and Ocean Oasis Waterparks ===
In 1985, waterslides were installed on Mariner's Landing and called Raging Waters waterpark. The project was masterminded by designer and architect Fred Langford. A second Raging Waters was built on Surfside Pier in 1988. This park was overhauled and relaunched as Ocean Oasis Water Park & Beach Club in 2006 and features Bonsai Beach, Endless River and various new waterslides.

=== Adventure Pier ===
Fun Pier was purchased and renamed Wild Wheels. The Morey's described it as an "interactive amusement center" with active participation by customers. This pier became home to The Great White, the Skyscraper ride, a The Spring Shot ride, a Screamin' Swing, and the Grand Prix Raceway. In 2006/2007, in conjunction with the new Surfside Pier branding at 26th Avenue, Wild Wheels became Adventure Pier. In 2012, the Skyscraper was relocated to the pier from the old Hunt's Pier, replacing two rides. The pier began removing smaller rides off the pier around this time as well, such as the Snake Slide, Apache Helicopters and a Carousel. In 2016, the Chambers of Checkers Maze was moved and rebranded to make way for a larger Grand Prix Raceway that now occupies most of the back part of the pier. In 2020, Morey's announced a gateway project that included the removal of boat tag, the existing Kohr Brothers' custard stand, and the old "SkyRide" station. In the place of these structures, multiple recycled shipping containers were to be retrofitted and home to a food hall with multiple new eating establishments, including a Curley's Fries and a new Kohr Brothers building. Due to the Coronavirus Pandemic, these plans were delayed. While a new Curley's location, Kohr Brothers, and a water Gun game were built using recycled shipping containers, the complete gateway project and food hall have yet to come to fruition, and are believed to be canceled. In November 2025, Morey's announced on their social media platforms that the "SkyCoaster" ride was to be removed as part of a future "Reimagining of Adventure Pier so that there can be many more adventures to come in future years." As of January 2026, it is not known exactly what this means for Adventure Pier, or when these plans will be completed.

=== The Old Hunt's Pier ===
Hunt's Pier was also eventually purchased for more rides and attractions. Hunt's Pier went defunct in 1990 and became Conko's Party Pier in 1991, Ocean Pier in 1993–1994, and was leased by the Catanosos in 1995 and called Atlantic Pier with kiddie rides on the front and the rest of the pier closed off with a white wall, and 1996–1998 Dinosaur Beach with the Golden Nugget Mine Rescue, Long Neck River Log Flume, and Raptor Rapids as the three surviving rides from Hunt's Pier to be reused for Dinosaur Beach. Dinosaur Beach permanently closed September 1998 and was then used for maintenance, storage, and tram-car parking with go-kart rides. The Golden Nugget remained on Hunt's Pier until 2009, when it was relocated to Knoebels Amusement Resort and reopened as the Black Diamond. As of 2026, no announcements have been made to add any attractions, and the pier is instead home to various shopping and eating establishments, a maintenance and storage facility, and a "Ripley's Believe It or Not!"-themed mirror maze.

== Rides and attractions ==
=== Surfside Pier ===
Name	Opened	Manufacturer	Type	Description
AtmosFear	2005	Larson	Drop Tower	
Balloon Race	1986	Zamperla	Balloon Race	
Carousel	unknown	Bertazzon		
Convoy	2018 Unknown (Mariner's Landing)			Formerly located at Mariner's Landing.
Cycle Jump	unknown			
Cygnus X-1	2008	Wisdom Ind.	Gravitron	
Dante's Dungeon	2005 (as Dante's Dungeon) 1981 (as Dante's Inferno)	Bertazzon Anton Schwarzkopf	Dark Ride	Originally known as Dante's Inferno
Doo Wopper	2005 1998 (Adventure Pier)	Zamperla	Zig Zag Coaster	Relocated to Surfside Pier & Replaced by Screamin’ Swing at Adventure Pier in 2005
The Great Nor'easter	1995	Vekoma	SLC	Re-tracked 2016–2017
It	2011	KMG	Afterburner/Fire Ball	Replaced Wipeout
Happy Feet	2012	Zamperla	Happy Swing	
Howitzer	unknown	Bertazzon		
Jump Around	2005	Zamperla	Jump Around	
Kang'A Bounce	2012	Zamperla		Replaced Condor, Replaced By Kong in 2015, before returning & Replaced SkyCoaster (Surfside Pier) in 2016
Kiddie Boats	unknown	Bertazzon		
Kong	2015	Larson	Flying Scooters	Revival of the 1970s ride of the same name, Replaced Kang’A Bounce until its return in 2016
Magic Bikes	2008	Zamperla	Magic Bikes	
Rock and Roll	2001	Bertazzon		
Rockin' Tug	2004	Zamperla	Rockin' Tug	
Runaway Tram	2019	Zierer	Force	Replaced the Flitzer
Tilt-A-Whirl	unknown	Sellner		
Wacky Whip	unknown	Zamperla	Speedway	Formerly located at Adventure Pier
Zoom Phloom	1985	Hopkins Rides	Log Plume	No Single Riders. (Since 2010)

=== Mariner's Landing ===
Name	Opened	Manufacturer	Type	Description
Airplanes	unknown	Zamperla	Mini Jet	
Baby Venice	unknown	SBF Visa Group		
Balloon Race	1983	Zamperla	Balloon Wheel	
Carousel (Mariner's Landing)	unknown	Bertazzon		
Crazy Bus	unknown	Zamperla	Crazy Bus	
Flying Galleons	1997	Zamperla	Suspension Monorail	
Giant Wheel	1985	Vekoma		No Single Riders (Since 2011).
Ghost Ship	2010	Morey's Piers	Walkthrough	
Henekee	unknown	Henekee		
Kiddie Swings	unknown	Bertazzon		
Kite Flyer	2002	Zamperla	Kite Flyer	
Mini Scooters	2009	Bertazzon		
Moby Dick	2000	Wisdom Ind.	Genesis	
Musik Express	1991	Bertazzon	Musik Express	
Pirates of the Wildwoods	2004 1992 (as Dark River)	Reverchon Ind.	Dark Ride	Formerly Dark River
Pink Elephants	unknown	Venture Rides		
Riptide	2012	Chance Rides	Pirate Ship/Pharaoh's Fury	Replaced Sea Dragon
Rollie's Coaster	1999	Pinfari	Zyklon	
Sea Serpent	1984	Vekoma	Boomerang	The first Vekoma Boomerang in the United States
Seagull Cycles	1997	Zamperla		
Sunny's Lookout Lighthouse	2005	Heege		
Super Scooters	2009	Bertazzon	Bumper Cars	
Tea Cups	1989	MACK Rides	TeaCup Ride	
Waltzer	unknown	Empire Amusements		
Wave Swinger	2014	Zierer	Wave Swinger	
Wild Whizzer	2018	SBF Visa Group	Spinning Coaster	

=== Adventure Pier ===
Name	Opened	Manufacturer	Type	Description
Grand Prix Raceway	1993	Creative Karts	Go-Karts	
Great White	1996	Custom Coasters Inc.	Wooden Coaster	
Screamin' Swing	2005	S&S Power	Screamin' Swing	
Skyscraper	2012 2000 (Surfside Pier)	Gravity Works	Booster Ride	It was operating at the Old Hunt's Pier (labeled a Surfside Pier ride), Relocated to Adventure Pier & Replaced Curse of the Mummy 3D & Jersey Junkyard in 2012, to make room for the canceled wooden coaster planned for Surfside Pier.
Spring Shot	2002	Funtime	Slingshot	No Single Riders (Since 2022)

=== Former rides and attractions ===
Name	Opened	Closed	Manufacturer	Type	Description
1001 Nachts	unknown	Around 2000	Weber	1001 Nachts	
Apache Helicopters	unknown	2012-2014			
Boat Tag	1986	2022	Unknown	Boat Tag	Replaced by Curley's Fries & various other stands; sold to Malacari's Produce & Deli
Breakdance	1985	2005	Huss	Breakdance	
Carousel (Adventure Pier)	1996	2015	Chance Rides	28-Foot Carousel	
Can Am Raceway	1993	2018	Creative Karts	Go-Karts	
Castle Dracula	1977	2002	Nickels	Walkthrough	Destroyed by fire
City Jet	1975	1984	Schwarzkopf	City Jet	Destroyed by fire
Condor	1988	2011	Huss	Condor	Replaced by Kang’A Bounce in 2012
Curse of the Mummy 3D	2000	2011			replaced by Skyscraper
Dante's Inferno	1981	2005	Bertazzon Anton Schwarzkopf	Dark Ride	Renovated into Dante's Dungeon
Dark River	1992	2003	Reverchon	Dark Ride	Replaced by the Pirates of Wildwood
Demolition Derby	unknown	2011	Zamperla	Demolition Derby	
Dune Buggies	unknown	2005-2009			
East Coast Helicopter Tours	unknown	2019		Helicopter Ride	
Enterprise	1977	1999			
Fireball Express	2002	2004			Replaced by Sea Dragon
Flitzer	1983	2018	Zierer	Flitzer	Replaced by Runaway Tram. Refurbished during 2004–2005 off season and rethemed from space to surf theme.
Formula One Racers	1993	2015	Creative Karts	Go-Karts	
Gravitron	1983	2007	Wisdom Ind.	Gravitron	The first Gravitron ride ever built, replaced by Cygnus X-1
Hangry Seagull	unknown	2018-2020	S&S - Sansei Technologies	Frog Hopper	Formerly Jack in The Box
Haunted House	1972	1984	Jim DeMusz/Fred Mahana	Walkthrough	
In Concert	1975	unknown			
Inverter	2000	2009	Chance Rides	Inverter	
Jersey Junkyard	1996	2011	Hollingsworth	Dark Ride	replaced by Skyscraper
Jet Star	1973	1999	Schwarzkopf	Jet Star	
Jumbo Jet	1975	1987	Schwarzkopf	Jet Star 3	Replaced by the Jet Star
Katapult	1985	late 1980's	Schwarzkopf	Katapult	
Kiddle Train	unknown	2019			
King Kong	1971	1980			
Luna's Lost Labyrinth	2016	2021	Minotaur Adventures		
Maelstrom	2000	2018	KMG	Spin Out	Replaced by a basketball game
Mini Scrambler	unknown	2012-2014			
Paddle Boats	unknown	early 2010s			
Parachutes	unknown	2004			Replaced by Sunny's Lookout Lighthouse
Petersburg Schlittenfahrt	1985	unknown			
Poseidon Adventure	1974	unknown			
RC-48	2000	2004	Pinfari	RC48	Sold to Wade Shows
Sea Dragon	unknown	2011		Pirate Ship	Replaced by Riptide following a 2011 incident where the mast broke off
Seal Flume	1990	2008	Zamperla	North Pole	Destroyed in the 2008 Mariner's Landing fire
Shark Bite (Surfside Pier)	1999	2018	Zamperla	Pounce and Bounce	
Shark Bite (Adventure Pier)	unknown	2013	S&S Power		
SkyCoaster (Adventure Pier)	1994	2025	Skycoaster Inc.	Skycoaster	
SkyCoaster (Surfside Pier)	unknown	2015	Skycoaster Inc.	Skycoaster	Replaced by the Kang'A Bounce in 2016
Sky Ride	1997	2011		Chairlift (3-CLF)	
Snake Slide	unknown	2013-2014			
Space Maze	unknown	2011			
Star Trek: Journey to the Planet of the Apes	1975	unknown			
The Storm	1999	2001	Moser	Super Loop on Top	
Tilt-A-Whirl (Adventure Pier)	unknown	2011	Sellner		
Tiny Tea Party	Unknown	2018	S&W Amusements		
Tornado	unknown	2016	Wisdom Ind.	Tornado	replaced by Luna's Lost Labyrinth
Wave Swinger (Original)	1977	2013			Replaced by an upgraded version of the same ride in 2014
Wipeout	1969	2010		Mat Slides	Refurbished as a water slide and relocated to the water park, Replaced by It
Zipper	1970	unknown	Chance Rides	Zipper	
Zyclone	1988	1989	Pinfari	Zyklon	
Zyklon	1967-1969	1999	Pinfari	Zyklon	Replaced by Rollie's Coaster
Wild Mouse	1957	1966-1968	B.A. Schiff & Associates	Wild Mouse	
Bear Country Jubilee	1978	1984	Creative Engineering Inc.	Animatronic Show	Sold back to Creative Engineering.

=== Cancelled rides ===
Name	Intended Opening Date	Manufacturer	Type	Description
Boardwalk Flyer	2013	Great Coasters International	Wooden Coaster	Would have crossed between Surfside Pier and the former Hunt's Pier.

== Incidents ==
=== The Great Nor'easter ===
In August 1995, a 36-year-old employee, Dallas White, was picking up trash in a fenced area beneath the ride and was struck in the head by a passenger's foot and killed. Shortly after this accident, Morey's Piers employed a new restricted section which prevents anyone underneath the ride while it is in motion.

=== Sea Serpent ===
In June 1998, the Sea Serpent roller coaster suffered its first ever accident, injuring 14 of the 23 riders on board, some of whom were stranded upside down. According to Will Morey, chief executive officer of the Morey Organization, the accident was thought to have been due to a wheel coming off a rear axle, causing the coaster train to jerk to a stop midway through the ride, as it was looping backwards.

=== Giant Wheel ===
On Friday June 3, 2011, 11-year-old Abiah Jones, a student at PleasanTech Academy Charter School in Pleasantville, New Jersey, died after falling between 100 and 150 feet from the Giant Wheel. She fell at about 12:30 p.m. and was pronounced dead at 1:14 p.m. at the Cape Regional Medical Center.

Her parents, Twanda and Byron Jones, subsequently filed a lawsuit against the ride's operator.

Investigators were unable to determine how the girl, who was riding alone, got out of the gondola. A report by the state Department of Community Affairs found the ride's restraints to be working properly and suggested that to get out of the car, a passenger probably would have had to stand. The report recommended that children be forbidden from riding the Ferris wheel alone.

=== SpringShot ===
In July 2021, a 13-year-old girl from Weatherly, Pennsylvania, was struck in the face by a seagull during the ride, but was not injured.

=== Sea Dragon ===
On August 20, 2011, five people were injured as a result of the center mast on the Sea Dragon breaking. One person was sent to the hospital with non life-threatening injuries, while four others had minor injuries that were treated at the scene of the accident. The spokeswoman for Morey's Piers and Beachfront Waterparks did not answer questions from the media regarding the incident.

For the 2012 season, the Sea Dragon has been replaced with a newer model of the same ride called Riptide.

=== Zoom Phloom ===
On July 2, 2010, a child was severely injured on the ride when he had a seizure, which caused him to strike his head on the car he was riding in, making him completely unconscious. Shortly after, the Morey's Piers management forbade guests to ride Zoom Phloom alone.

=== Bomb Threat ===
On June 6, 2021, at 7:40 PM, a bomb threat was delivered to Wildwood Police Department via 9-1-1 call targeting all three Morey's amusement piers. A mass evacuation was ordered and a major emergency response followed, among the agencies and resources to respond were the Federal Bureau of Investigation, K-9 units from Atlantic, Cape May, and Cumberland Counties, Atlantic City Police Department Explosive Ordnance Disposal Unit, and the Cape May County Department of Health Hazardous Materials/CBRNE Team. A meticulous search was conducted and finished at 12:30AM June 7, 2021 with no explosives or Weapons of Mass Destruction found. Business promptly resumed the next day with no enhanced security or preparedness measures. Multiple other venues across Southern New Jersey including Jenkinsons Boardwalk in Point Pleasant reported similar bomb threats during that week.
