= Candlemas Island =

Island of the Candlemas Islands in the South Sandwich Islands

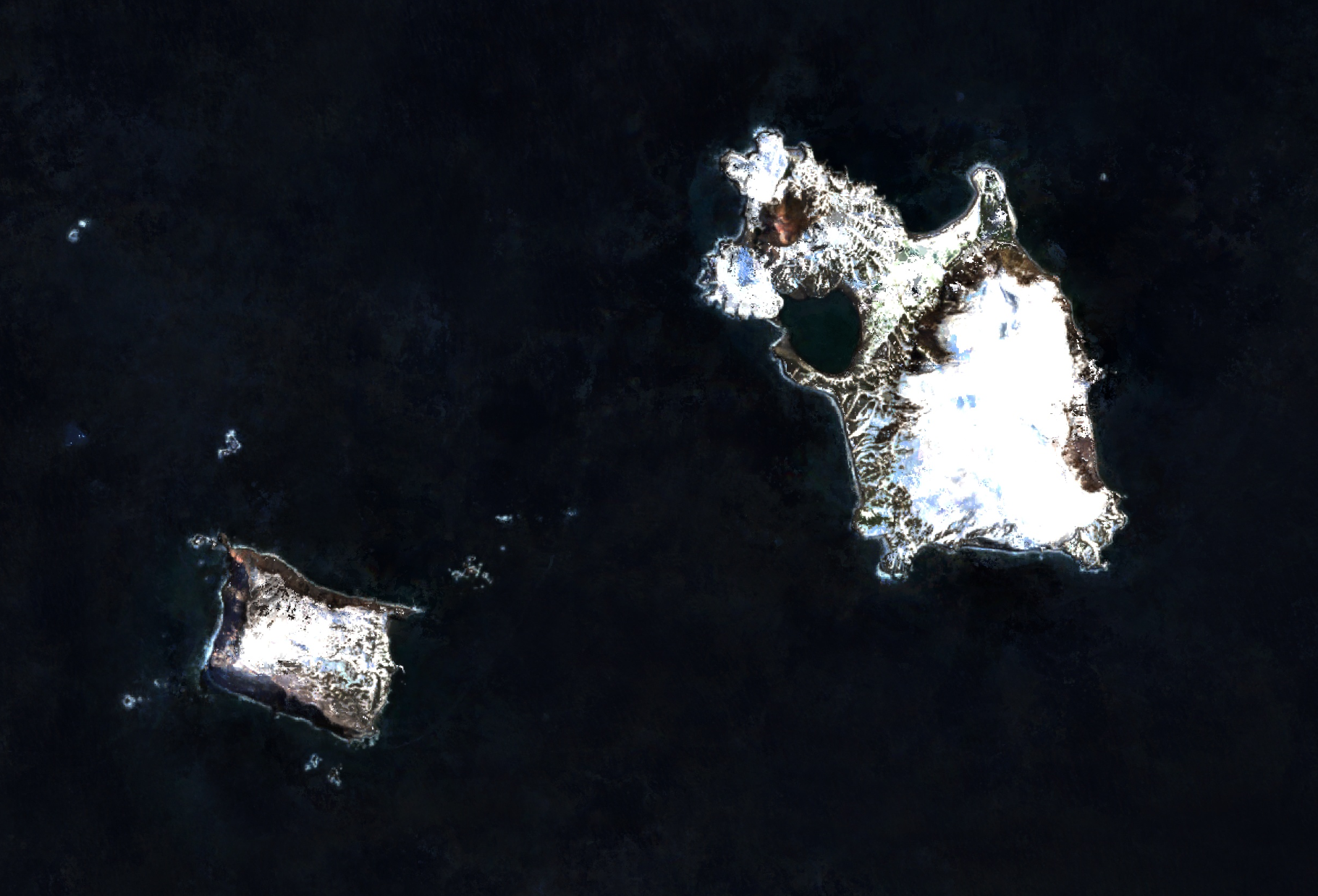
- Satellite image showing Candlemas Island and the smaller Vindication Island

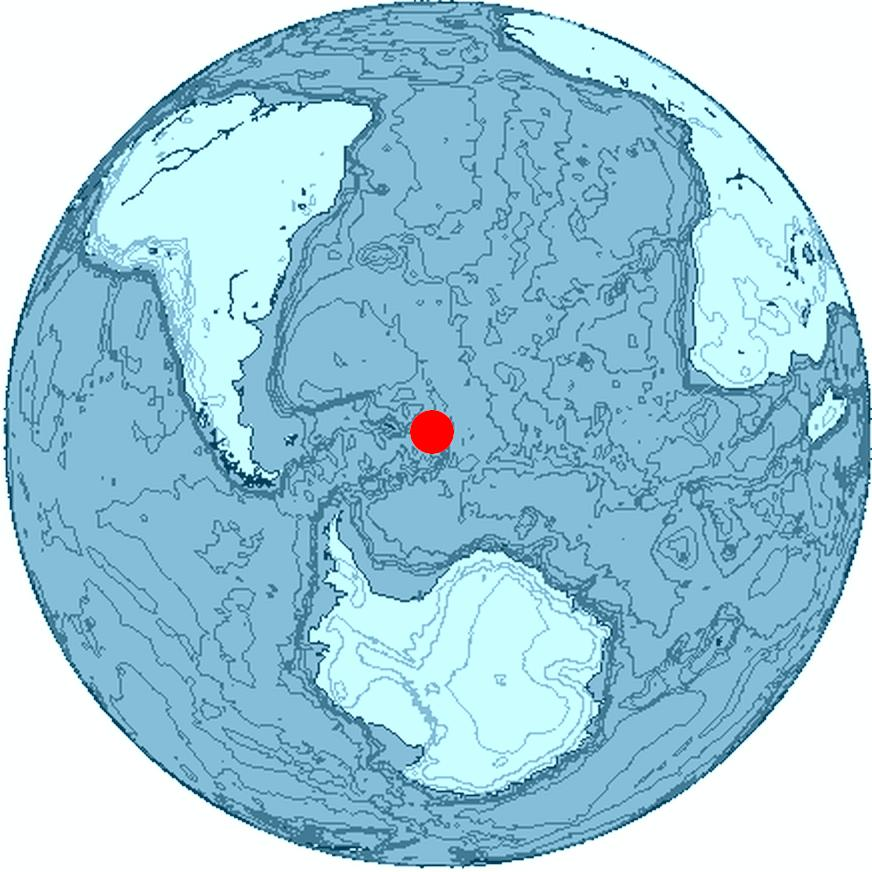

Geography
- Location: 57.09°S 26.71°W
- Highest elevation: 550 m (1800 ft)
- Highest point: Mount Andromeda

Administration
- United Kingdom
- Territory: South Georgia and the South Sandwich Islands

Demographics
- Population: Uninhabited

Candlemas Island is a small uninhabited island of the Candlemas Islands in the South Sandwich Islands. It is one of about a dozen islands that make up the South Sandwich island arc, a chain of volcanoes in the Southern Ocean that was discovered in 1775 by James Cook. The volcanism is caused by the subduction of the South American Plate beneath the Sandwich Plate. The island is remote and rarely visited due to the often hostile weather conditions, but is populated by penguins and seabirds, which form large breeding colonies.

The island consists of two parts. The southeastern part is older and consists of the heavily glaciated volcanoes Mount Andromeda - with 550 metres (1,800 ft) elevation the highest point of the island - and Mount Perseus, and shows no evidence of recent activity. The northwestern part features the younger scoria cone complex Lucifer Hill, which is surrounded by lava flows. Some of the lava flows may have been emplaced during the 20th century. The older rocks consist mostly of basalt and basaltic andesite, while the younger rocks are predominantly andesite and dacite; the two groups share a common magma formation process.

The Lucifer Hill complex features numerous fumaroles which emit volcanic gases. A vegetation community consisting of mosses and lichens grows around the fumaroles, with some members extending to non-fumarolic terrain.

== Geography and geomorphology ==
Candlemas Island is one of the South Sandwich Islands, a 320 kilometres (200 mi) long north–south trending island arc to the southeast of South Georgia and the Falklands. They include Zavodovski, Leskov Island, Visokoi, Candlemas and Vindication Island, Saunders Island, Montagu Island, Bristol Island and Freezland Rock, Bellingshausen Island, Cook Island and Thule Island. All the islands are small and volcanic, most showing evidence of activity during the last two centuries. They are subject to intense marine erosion. Submarine volcanoes include Protector Shoals at the northern end and Nelson and Kemp seamounts at the southern end of the island chain.

The island is also known as Lichtmess-Insel and Candelaria. It is rarely visited owing to the hostile weather and sea conditions, and the south and southeast coasts are hardly accessible; tourist vessels occasionally land on Candlemas. Longline fishing takes place in the surrounding waters. Politically, South Georgia and the South Sandwich Islands make up the UK Overseas Territory of South Georgia and the South Sandwich Islands. In 2012, a marine protected area was established in the South Sandwich Islands. The scope of the protected area was further expanded in 2019.

With dimensions of 6 by 4 kilometres (3.7 mi × 2.5 mi), Candlemas is the third-largest of the South Sandwich Islands and consists of a southeastern, roughly square-shaped half and an irregularly shaped northwestern half. Vindication Island to the west is separated from Candlemas by the shallow (24 metres (79 ft)-27 metres (89 ft)) 3.7 kilometres (2.3 mi) wide Nelson Channel. Visokoi lies 42 kilometres (26 mi) north and Saunders 76 kilometres (47 mi) south of Candlemas Island.

The northwestern half consists of a complex of scoria cones named Lucifer Hill (also known as Lucifer Hills), which reach a maximum elevation of 232 metres (761 ft), 229 metres (751 ft) or 140 metres (460 ft) above sea level. Two main craters with depths of about 15 metres (49 ft) and diameters of 137 metres (449 ft) flank the main summit, which has a flat top. A subsidiary crater lies on the southwestern flank. They are surrounded by five lava flows, the eastern of which is old and covered with volcanic ash while the northern one is younger, with an irregular surface featuring blocks, ridges and gullies. The lava flows are morphologically aa lavas. The eastern lava flow forms Breakbones Plateau, while a northwestward extending lava flow constitutes the Vulcan Point peninsula. The southwestward and northwestward extending lava flows enclose the Tow Bay; Cauldron Pool lies just east of Tow Bay. Another unnamed pool lies at the end of Clinker Gulch on Lucifer Hill, and there are freshwater pools throughout the island. The coastline is formed by cliffs with interspersed recesses and bays.

The southeastern half is the larger and consists of an extinct and eroded stratovolcano. A north-south trending ridge has two summits, the northeastern 455 metres (1,493 ft) high Mount Perseus and the southeastern Mount Andromeda; the latter is the highest point of Candlemas with 550 metres (1,800 ft) or 557 metres (1,827 ft) elevation. This half is asymmetric, rising from west to east, which may indicate that it is the remnant of a formerly larger volcano that was centered east of the current island. Glaciers cover most of the southeastern half of Candlemas, an area of 4.2 square kilometres (1.6 sq mi) as of 1964 which amounts to 40% of the island. The ice reaches thicknesses of 23 metres (75 ft) in coastal cliff exposures. On the southern and eastern side of Candlemas, the ice descends to the sea, in the north it forms glacier tongues at elevations of 120 metres (390 ft) surrounded by a belt of moraines around the ice edge. Streams draining meltwater have incised glacial deposits. Cliffs with heights of 30–300 metres (98–984 ft) form most of the southern and eastern coasts, while a 18 metres (59 ft) wide youthful coastal terrace makes up the western and northern side. Marine deposits have formed the northward extending Demon Point peninsula, which encloses Kraken Bay between the peninsula and Lucifer Hill. Shrove Point is the southeastern end of Candlemas Island, while Boot Rock juts out from the eastern coastline and Clapmatch and Carbon Points. 750 metres (2,460 ft) east of the coastline is the islet Tomblin Point.

Between the two halves lies Chimaera Flats, a southwest–northeast trending sandy plain with two lagoons named Gorgon Pool and Medusa Pool. Medusa Pool is the southwestern lagoon and was connected to the sea at Sea Serpent Cove in 1964, while Gorgon Pool is the northeastern one. The configuration of Chimaera Flats is variable over time, during 1830-1927 Candlemas Island was sometimes reported to consist of three islands although visual conditions can lead to Candlemas Island being mistaken for two islands. The two halves of Candlemas Island shielded the terrain from marine erosion, thus allowing the growth of spits formed by boulders and shingles.

=== Submarine structure ===
Both Candlemas and Vindication rise from the same submarine volcano, and are named the Candlemas Islands. Around the islands the sea is less than 100 metres (330 ft) deep, forming a 12 kilometres (7.5 mi) wide shallow platform with numerous shoals, islets and sea stacks. They are remnants of eroded islands and include Buddha Rock, Castor Rock, Cook Rock, Pollux Rock, Santa Rock, Saw Rock, Tomblin Rock and Trousers Rock. Most of the islets lie around Vindication. Some of these rocks make up a series of shoals between the islands. The shelf itself probably formed through marine erosion and scouring by icebergs.

The volcano has a base diameter of more than 53 kilometres (33 mi) at 2,500 metres (8,200 ft) and a total volume of about 2,200 cubic kilometres (530 cu mi). Away from the shallow platform, the slopes of the volcano drop off steeply into the deep ocean. East of Candlemas and abutting its southeastern side is a large 16 kilometres (9.9 mi) wide submarine embayment, probably the remnant of a large sector collapse. Two other structures interpreted as landslide scars lie north and south of the shelf, which is scalloped by landslide scars. The submarine slopes have wave-like bedforms in many places. Smaller ridges emanate from the submarine volcano and are interpreted as parts of it, while chutes emanating in all directions formed through mass wasting. A submarine ridge at 1 kilometre (0.62 mi) depth connects the group to Visokoi farther north. West of Candlemas, monogenetic volcanoes are developed on the seafloor.

== Geology ==
East of the South Sandwich Islands, the South America Plate subducts into the more than 7,000 metres (23,000 ft) deep South Sandwich Trench at a rate of 67–79 millimetres per year (2.6–3.1 in/year). The volcanic arc consists of volcanoes with heights of 3 kilometres (1.9 mi) that developed on top of the Sandwich Plate, which is produced at the East Scotia Ridge west of the arc. Both the underlying oceanic crust (8-10 million years old) and the volcanic arc appear to be young; this may explain the peculiar basalt-rich composition and small size of the volcanoes.

=== Composition ===
Volcanic rocks from Candlemas consist of basalt, basaltic andesite, andesite and dacite. The basalts and basaltic andesite define a potassium-poor tholeiitic suite, while the andesites and dacites are calc-alkaline. Phenocrysts include feldspar, olivine, plagioclase and pyroxene, and there are gabbro-like xenoliths, but unlike other South Sandwich volcanoes the lavas are mostly aphyric. Rocks from the older southeastern half are mostly basaltic, the younger northwestern half is mostly andesitic/ dacitic, one dacitic obsidian has been reported from the southeastern half. Some rocks have been weathered. Sulfur has accumulated around active fumaroles.

The basalt, which forms about 90% of all Candlemas rocks, is considered to be the primary rock, from which the andesites evolved through fractional crystallization. A contribution of melting slab rocks is likely. The rocks of southeastern Candlemas resemble these of Vindication.

== Eruption history ==
No rocks from Candlemas Island have been dated, but the island appears to have formed in two stages. During the first stage, the southeastern half of the island formed, which today constitutes about 90% of the volume of Candlemas. Outcrops in cliffs of the southeastern half of the island feature alternating layers of porphyritic lava flows and scoria, which are intruded by dykes and sills and show evidence of later deformation. Apart from the lava flows, some deposits were originally emplaced in now-dry lagoons, others formed through fallout. Subglacial eruptions of Mount Perseus produced glacial meltwater floods. Close to Medusa Pool, some lava flows have become palagonitic. Later in the history of the island, two lava flows were emplaced on the southwestern end of the southeastern half of Candlemas; they form Carbon Point and Clapmatch Point. These flows may be analogous to historical eruptions at Tristan da Cunha. The southeastern half of the island was extensively eroded by the sea and by glaciers.

After a hiatus, volcanism shifted north of the previous volcanic centre, where eruptions in shallow water formed Lucifer Hill initially probably as a separate island. It is possible that an earlier volcano existed at the present location of Lucifer Hill, leaving pyroclastic flow deposits in the northwestern sector of the southeastern half of Candlemas Island. Lucifer Hill consists mostly of volcanic ash mixed with scoria, with blocks reaching sizes of 15 centimetres (5.9 in). The oldest outcrops belong to the northern cone and are found in Clinker Gulch. The cones emitted numerous lava flows reaching thicknesses of 15–46 metres (49–151 ft), separated by scoria and ash eruptions. Lava flows are thick and fragmented, with surface ridges. The relative ages of the lava flows have been established from their appearance and relative grade of erosion; two southern and northern flows formed first. Then the entire eastern half of the lava flow field was emplaced. Subsequently, the southwestern lava flow was erupted from the southern vent. Last, the northwestern lava flow and lava flows on the southeastern flank were emplaced. The lava flows form 1 kilometre (0.62 mi) wide lava deltas.

=== Chronology and historical reports ===
Unlike the first stage, which may have lasted for 1-2 million years, the second stage probably only began a few centuries or millennia ago, which might make it one of the youngest volcanoes of the South Sandwich Islands. There is no evidence of recent activity in the southeastern half of the island, other than a localized tilting in its northwestern sector that may be caused by the activity of northwestern Candlemas.

The ice of Mount Andromeda contains tephra layers produced by eruptions of Lucifer Hill. A 6,000 years old tephra layer in the Vostok and South Pole ice cores has been tentatively attributed to a large explosive eruption at Candlemas, which would have spread ash over a distance of 4,000 kilometres (2,500 mi). Research published in 2001 indicated that this tephra may have originated at a different South Sandwich Islands volcano. The Global Volcanism Program cites a 1250 BCE eruption recorded in ice cores, most likely from Candlemas. Five other tephra layers in the Vostok ice core, dated to 30,000, 36,500, 109,500 years ago, and 1,613 and 1,612 BCE, may have originated at Candlemas. Two tephra layers in East Antarctica dated to 1,994 and 1,632 BCE might also originate there.

Owing to their remote location, volcanic activity in the South Sandwich Islands is poorly documented. No eruptions have been directly observed at Candlemas. Steam and dark clouds were reported in 1823 and 1911. Some discrepancies between maps may indicate activity since 1930. Glowing lava fields were observed from the RRS John Biscoe in 1953–1954 on the northern side of Candlemas, and steam emission indicates that the northern lava flow may have been emplaced during this eruption, but it is not clear which lava flow, and the 1953-1954 report was considered questionable by LeMasurier et al. 1990. Volcanic tremors were recorded in 1998.

=== Fumaroles ===
Lucifer Hill is fumarolically active, emitting steam and sulfurous gases. Gas emissions are concentrated in its two craters and at various fumaroles on its lower slopes. The fumarolic activity can be seen from passing ships. One fumarole in 2020 had a temperature of 96 °C (205 °F). Carbon dioxide is the principal non-water gas emitted by the fumaroles; sulfur species are dominated by hydrogen sulfide. Temperatures underground reach 50 °C (122 °F) at 45 centimetres (18 in) depth; the volcanic warmth keeps Lucifer Hill ice-free and the lack of ice/ heat signature has been observed from space by satellites. The southeastern half of Candlemas lacks fumarolic activity.

Vent locations change over time, with a survey in 1997 noting a decline of fumarolic activity and vegetation shifts associated with changes in the fumarolic vents. In 1962, a geyser was observed at Cauldron Pool; in 1964 the geyser was gone but water temperatures in the pool exceeded 31 °C (88 °F) in many locations, with the pool itself steaming. In 1997 the hot pools were gone as well, but as of 2013 Cauldron Pool does not freeze over.

== Climate ==
The South Sandwich Islands have an oceanic climate with sparse sunshine, low seasonal temperature variation and temperatures only a few degrees above freezing most of the year. The skies on Candlemas Island are usually overcast, and strong westerly winds blow. The winds mobilize glacial dust and volcanic deposits. Fog is common. Between June and November the sea surrounding the islands is covered with sea ice. Icebergs occur around Candlemas and occasionally run aground in shallow waters.

== Life ==
Plant communities consisting of hepatics, liverworts and mosses grow around fumaroles with a distinct structuration that can extend to 20 metres (66 ft) width. Fumaroles provide water through condensation of steam, supporting life. Similar but less well-developed communities grow on cold terrain, where various forms of lichens predominate. Plant cover is most widespread on Breakbones Plateau and at the edge of the ice cap. The ground temperatures where mosses grow range between 85 °C (185 °F) and 0 °C (32 °F). Dead plants have accumulated to form peat, in some places reaching thicknesses of 20 centimetres (7.9 in). Algae grow inside of fumarolic vents, in ice and in bird colonies. Basidiomycetes fungi grow among the plants, and other fungi cause white bands in the vegetation, killing it. One higher plant, the Antarctic hair grass, has been reported from fumarolic terrain and its occurrence is restricted to these.

The vegetation resembles that of Deception Island, another volcanic island around Antarctica. The low temperatures and the high permeability of the ground restrict vegetation growth on most of the South Sandwich Islands, and trampling and faecal input from penguin colonies further limit growth close to penguin colonies. There are no known introduced species.

Seabirds are abundant at Candlemas. Penguins, petrels and skuas visit the island, and there are penguin colonies at numerous sites along the coast. Large breeding populations with over a hundred members have been recorded for Adélie penguins, brown skuas, cape petrels, chinstrap penguins, gentoo penguins, macaroni penguins, snow petrels, southern fulmars, southern giant petrels (their main breeding site in the South Sandwich Islands). Other birds that breed on Candlemas are Wilson's storm petrels and black-bellied storm petrels. Mammals include Antarctic fur seals, elephant seals, leopard seals and Weddell seals, which reproduce on the island. Penguin populations appear to be stable on Candlemas Island. Finds of charred bones imply that penguin populations are sometimes impacted by volcanic activity. Small animals include mites, nematodes, rotifers, springtails and tardigrades. Ticks have been recovered from birds. Amphipods, brittle stars and echinoderms occur on the shelf around Candlemas Island, and sea pens from somewhat deeper waters.

=== New species ===
The bacterium Bacillus fumarioli was discovered in soils on Candlemas Island, Mount Melbourne and Mount Rittmann. This wide dispersion may indicate that it is propagated by wind. Other species that were originally discovered on Candlemas Island are Bacillus shackletonii, which grew in soils on lava flows and was later renamed Heyndrickxia shackletonii, Bacillus luciferensis, which was discovered in soils from Lucifer Hill and named after the site of discovery, Paenibacillus cineris and Paenibacillus cooki, both from soil around an active fumarole. The mite Calvolia antarctica was discovered in lichen-encrusted rocks of Candlemas Island.

== Research history ==
Candlemas Island was discovered on 2 February 1775 (Candlemas Day, hence the name) by James Cook from the HMS Resolution, but he did not visit it. In the 19th century, only sealers went to Candlemas, and whaling took place in the surrounding sea. During the 20th century scientific research and landings began, first C.A. Larsen in 1908 landed on Shrove Point at the southeastern end of Candlemas, then by the RRS Shackleton in January 1961 and the ice patrol ship HMS Protector in March 1962 and 1964. As a consequence of the 1964 visit, Candlemas Island is the best investigated of the South Sandwich Islands. Some of these investigations established temporary field camps on Candlemas Island. Sealing and whaling activities are largely undocumented, but archaeological evidence indicates that landing parties stayed on Candlemas for several weeks, and sealing activity may have led to the disappearance of Antarctic fur seals from the surroundings.

== Other ==
Marine debris, mostly human in origin, has been found at Candlemas Island.

== See also ==
- Breakbones Plateau
- List of Antarctic and sub-Antarctic islands
- List of volcanoes in South Sandwich Islands
- Tomblin Rock
