= Geology of South Georgia and the South Sandwich Islands =

South Georgia and the South Sandwich Islands are parts of the largely submerged Scotia Ridge in the South Atlantic Ocean. They were formed during the Jurassic era due to tectonic movement followed by intense volcanic activity. Further shifting of tectonic plates and subduction along the ocean, resulted in the upliftment the islands later.

== Formation ==
South Georgia and the South Sandwich Islands are parts of the largely submerged Scotia Ridge in the South Atlantic Ocean. It consists of a curved chain of mountains and underwater ridges which link the southern Andes to the Antarctic Peninsula. It was formed from the breakup of the supercontinent Gondwana during the Jurassic era, due to tectonic movement followed by intense volcanic activity. During mid-Cretaceous period, the shifting of tectonic plates caused an upliftment along the Pacific ocean, which formed the northern and southern end of the ridges. The South Sandwich Islands arc developed due to westward subduction of the ridge beneath the ocean floor between South America and Antarctica during the Neogene period.

== South Sandwich Islands ==
The South Sandwich Islands are remote, volcanic islands formed by subduction at the eastern edge of the Scotia Sea. Geological research of the islands show three stages of development. A large sediment mount probably caused by the collapse of the flanks, over which the caldera is nested in a deeply faulted structure. There are several cones atop them likely formed from renewed volcanic activity after the caldera was formed. The surrounding ocean has a low-salinity on the surface likely due to meltwater from the ice caps on the islands due to warming and geothermal heat from volcanic activity beneath the ice.

== South Georgia ==
South Georgia is an isolated island located in the South Atlantic Ocean and forms the largest island in the northern Scotia ridge. Much of the island as formed by several layers of sandstone and mudstone formed by volcanic activity from the Cretaceous period. The rocks were then deformed by uneven folding and thrusting toward the northeast part of the ridge, creating multiple layers. In the southeast of the island, a major shear zone separates two groups of rock formations. These include several dikes, gneiss rocks, and granite formed probably during the Triassic period.

The island of South Georgia is unusual among oceanic islands for having pre-Cretaceous sedimentary rocks underlying much of the island and a significant portion of felsic igneous rocks. Two-thirds of the island consists of intensely folded flysch, capped with Aptian age fossils, tuff and greywacke in the Cumberland Bay Series. The series includes slate, phyllite, conglomerate, siltstone and sandstone. In the west are basalt flows, pillowed spilite, prehnite and trachyandesite, as well as shale with radiolarite fossils.

Uranium-lead dating of zircon and muscovite grains from the southern Andes and South Georgia (gathered from the peraluminous Darwin granite suite and undersea Tobifera Formation rhyolite) indicates that the rocks formed during the middle Jurassic. The grains were likely remnant from 1.5 billion years ago. The fragmentation of the Gondwana supercontinent is preserved in an ophiolite in the Rocas Verdes marginal basin—part of the Larsen Harbour complex on South Georgia. As the continent fragmented, oceanic crust formed in the Weddell Sea in the Middle Jurassic. The ridge's Beagle granite suite has complicated uranium-lead data. Feldspar phenocrysts formed in cracks within the Beagle granite pluton, likely related to the tectonism affecting the high-grade metamorphic rocks of the Cordillera Darwin in Tierra del Fuego.

== See also ==
- Scotia Plate – Minor oceanic tectonic plate between the Antarctic and South American plates
- South Sandwich Plate – Small tectonic plate south of the South American plate
