= Mount Michael =

Active stratovolcano in the South Sandwich Islands

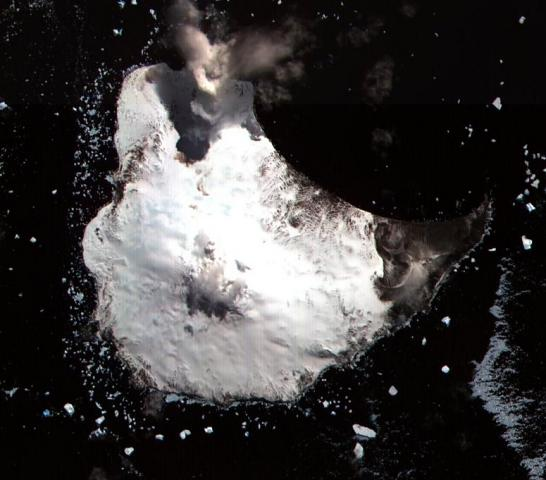
- Saunders Island

Highest point
- Elevation: 843 m (2,766 ft)
- Prominence: 843 m (2,766 ft)
- Coordinates: 57°48′13″S 26°28′52″W

Geography
- Location: Saunders Island, South Sandwich Islands

Geology
- Mountain type: Stratovolcano
- Last eruption: 2014-2025 (ongoing)

Mount Michael is an active stratovolcano on Saunders Island in the remote South Sandwich Islands of the South Atlantic Ocean. It is one of only a few volcanoes on Earth confirmed to host a persistent lava lake within its summit crater.

== Geology ==
Mount Michael and the other volcanoes of the South Sandwich Islands are the result of ongoing subduction of the South American Plate beneath the South Sandwich Plate along the South Sandwich Trench. As the oceanic slab descends, it releases water and other volatiles that lower the melting point of the overlying mantle wedge. This process generates basaltic to basaltic-andesitic magmas that ascend through thin oceanic crust and build the island arc volcanoes. Mount Michael is one of the most active volcanoes of the South Sandwich Islands.

The subduction system consists of the eastern side of the broader Scotia Arc, consisting of arcs, ridges, and microplates. This links the South Atlantic Ocean and Southern Ocean. There is also active back-arc rifting behind the South Sandwich Islands.

The active crater rises from an older caldera. Due to its southern latitude, the volcano is almost entirely covered by ice and snow.

There are two submarine seamount chains extending north of Saunders Island, known as the Harpers and Saunders Banks, which are likely connected to the island’s formation. Tephra and lava layers exposed in coastal cliffs indicate frequent eruptions in recent times.

== Volcanic activity ==
Eruptive activity is nearly continuous, consisting of a persistent active lava lake, steam plumes, and degassing. The Global Volcanism Program lists continuous activity since at least late 2014. Historical records date eruptions back to 1819, when ash clouds were reported by Russian explorers.

Due to the South Sandwich Islands remote location, modern monitoring relies on satellite data. Instruments such as MODIS (via MIROVA and MODVOLC) frequently detect thermal anomalies at the summit. NASA has also captured visible and false-color plume imagery during rare clear-sky windows.

== Lava lake ==
A 2019 study by Gray et al. confirmed Mount Michael’s persistent lava lake using 30 years of Landsat and Sentinel-2 imagery. The molten surface, roughly 90–215 m across and 989–1279 °C was observed in nearly every clear-sky satellite image between 2003–2018. This discovery made Mount Michael one of fewer than ten volcanoes on Earth with a permanent lava lake, alongside Mount Erebus, Nyiragongo, and Ambrym.

== Exploration ==
Mount Michael was first observed in 1819, when Bellingshausen’s Russian expedition reported an ash cloud. Few people have visited the island since due to its remoteness. In 1997, geologist John Smellie observed persistent degassing from offshore. In 2022, a National Geographic sponsored expedition led by UCL volcanologist Emma Nicholson, achieved the first documented ascent of Mount Michael, directly observing a glowing lava lake. The team also installed a seismic station and collected gas, water, and snow samples for further scientific research.

== Climate ==
The South Sandwich Islands have a sub-Antarctic maritime climate with nearly year-round storms, near-freezing temperatures, and heavy cloud cover. Mount Michael is often obscured by clouds and snow, limiting visual observations to only a few clear days each year.

== Ecology ==
Saunders Island hosts large colonies of chinstrap and macaroni penguins, Antarctic fur seals, and southern elephant seals. The coastal plains also provide nesting grounds for millions of seabirds. Volcanic ash layers have occasionally impacted colonies, burying nesting sites, but populations have rebounded. The surrounding ocean is part of the South Georgia and the South Sandwich Islands Marine Protected Area, which safeguards over 500,000 km² of land.
