= East Scotia Basin =

East Scotia Basin is a submarine basin that lies in the Scotia Sea of the South Atlantic ocean, behind the South Sandwich trench and between latitudes 55–60° S. It is bounded to the north by the North Scotia Ridge, which includes the island of South Georgia, and to the east by the South Sandwich Islands. A rise that runs from South Georgia to the South Orkney Islands separates the East Scotia Basin from the West Scotia Basin.
