= Saunders Island, South Sandwich Islands =

British island in the southern Atlantic

Saunders Island
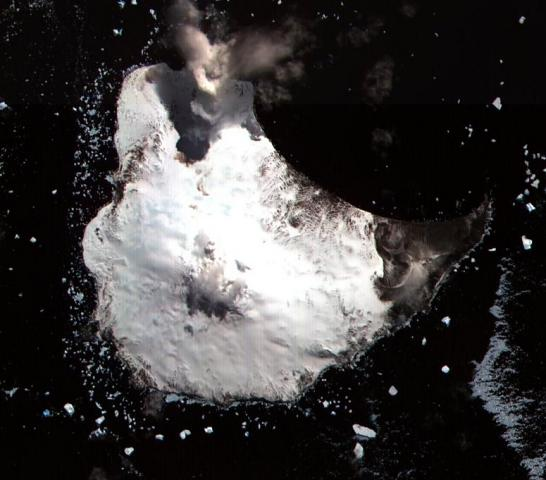

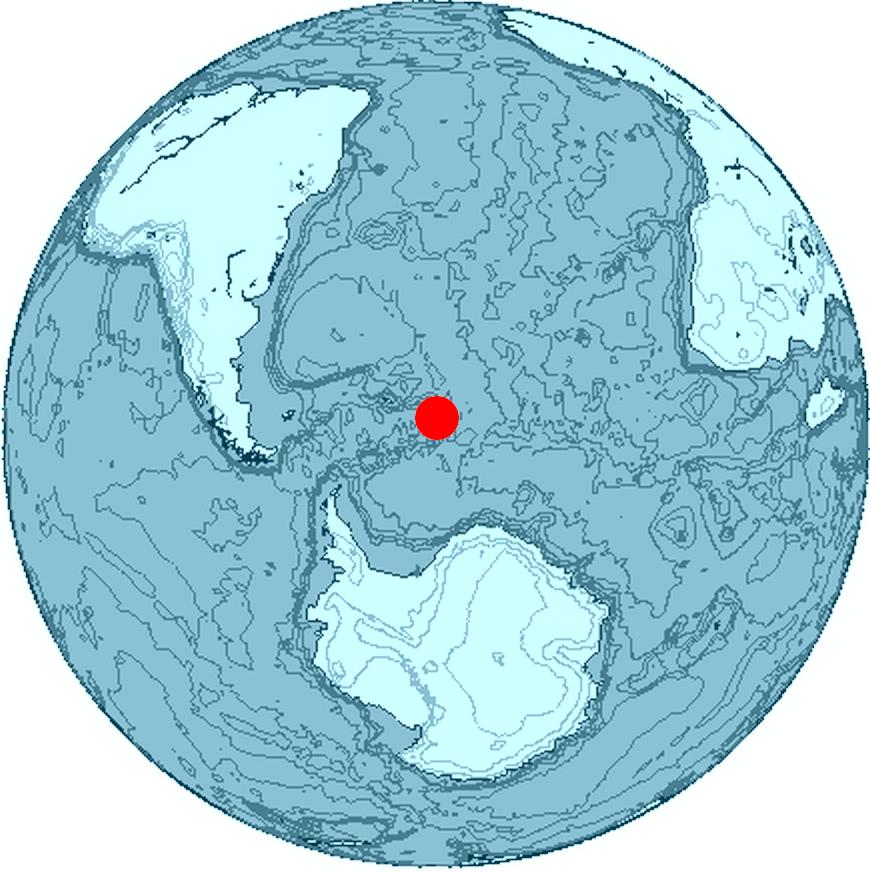
- Location of Saunders Island

Geography
- Coordinates: 57.80°S 26.49°W
- Archipelago: South Sandwich Islands
- Highest elevation: 990 m (3250 ft)
- Highest point: Mount Michael

Administration
- United Kingdom

Demographics
- Population: Uninhabited

Saunders Island is a crescent-shaped island lying between Candlemas Island and Montagu Island in the South Sandwich Islands, a British Overseas Territory in the southern Atlantic Ocean.

The 8.5 by 5 kilometres (5.3 mi × 3.1 mi) long Saunders is a volcanic island composed of an active stratovolcano, 990-metre (3,248 ft) Mount Michael, and a cluster of pyroclastic cones on the southeastern side. Mount Michael has a lava lake in its summit crater, which is fumarolically active, and there is widespread evidence of recent eruptions across the island.

The island is used as a breeding ground by many bird species, including penguins, but is barren of vegetation apart from lichens and some moss-covered patches. Most of the island is covered in ice.

== Geography and geology ==
=== Regional ===
Saunders Island was discovered in 1775 by James Cook from HMS Resolution, and is part of the South Sandwich Islands in the southern Atlantic Ocean at the eastern end of the Scotia Sea. They lie about 2,000 kilometres (1,200 mi) north of Antarctica and about the same distance south-east of the Falklands. The islands are very remote and thus volcanic eruptions tend to go unnoticed, and bad weather and hazardous oceanic conditions make landings difficult. Politically, they are part of the British Overseas Territory of South Georgia and the South Sandwich Islands, and tourist boats occasionally land on Saunders Island, which is accessible through several boulder beaches. The waters around the island are fished commercially.

East of the South Sandwich Islands, the Atlantic Ocean subducts in the South Sandwich Trench under the South Sandwich Plate at a rate of 65–78 millimetres per year (2.6–3.1 in/year). During the past five million years, this subduction process has given rise to the South Sandwich volcanic arc. This volcanic arc includes the Protector Shoal, Kemp Caldera and Adventure Caldera seamounts, and numerous small islands, extending over a distance of about 350 kilometres (220 mi). From north to south these are: Zavodovski Island, Visokoi Island, Leskov Island, Candlemas Island-Vindication Island, Saunders Island, Montagu Island, Bristol Island, Bellingshausen Island-Cook Island-Southern Thule. The largest islands are Saunders Island, Montagu Island, and Bristol Island, and most volcanoes (except for Vindication) have either fumarolic activity or historical eruptions. The islands are formed by layers of lava flows and pyroclastic rocks that form stratovolcanoes, and their rocks have compositions ranging from basalt to basaltic andesite that define a calc-alkaline suite.

=== Local ===
Saunders Island has dimensions of about 8.5 by 5 kilometres (5.3 mi × 3.1 mi) with a crescent-like shape. On the eastern side of the island, 6 kilometres (3.7 mi) wide Cordelia Bay opens to the northeast between Nattriss Point, (Note: Named after the shipping officer of the Discovery Committee, E.A. Nattriss. It was first charted by Bellingshausen in 1819 and re-charted by the Discovery Expedition in 1930.) a rocky headland, to the east and Sombre Point to the north, with the Brothers Rocks 2 kilometres (1.2 mi) due north of Cordelia Bay and reefs especially on its northern side. The southern part of the crescent west of Nattriss Point is formed by the inactive craters of the Ashen Hills which form a distinct topographic elevation; the northern part of the crescent is blunter, forming the highly conspicuous Yellowstone Crags, Blackstone Plain and Harper Point, the northernmost point of Saunders Island. Between these lies the ice-covered bulk of the island with the 990 metres (3,250 ft) high Mount Michael volcano. To its west lies the small Carey Point peninsula and the larger Ollivant Point peninsula to the northwest. The coasts are formed by cliffs, including ice cliffs, with inset bays and bouldery or sandy beaches.

About 80% of the island is covered by ice. Rocky outcrops occur at the coasts, eroded pyroclastic cones on the eastern side and the Mount Michael volcano. Mount Michael is a steep-sided ice-covered conical stratovolcano with a summit crater. The elevation of the summit of Mount Michael is mostly given as 990 metres (3,250 ft); other reported heights are 843 metres (2,766 ft) and 890 metres (2,920 ft). The width of the summit crater is not precisely known but may reach about 700 metres (2,300 ft) or 500 metres (1,600 ft). The summit crater is surrounded by a second crater, conspicuous to the south and southeast, which is filled by ice. It may be a caldera, or a somma volcano. A glacier descends on Mount Michael's eastern side, and the ice is full of crevasses.

Cordelia Bay is about 30–50 metres (98–164 ft) deep and does not appear to be a collapse scar or crater. At Ollivant Point, there is a bouldery beach with boulder ridges. The ocean swells are high enough to frequently submerge the beach, which is surmounted by beach ridges. The Ashen Hills consist of a cluster of overlapping pyroclastic cones and feature tuff cones, which are uncharacteristic of South Sandwich Islands volcanoes that mostly lack evidence of highly explosive eruptions. There are four craters; the southern one has been partially eroded away and river erosion in the Ashen Hills has formed gullies that expose deposits from base surges.

The island lies on the southern and southwestern side of a larger shallow shelf. It extends to the north to form Saunders Bank, while there are traces of past sector collapses on the western side, and of submarine eruptions around the island, and of gullies formed by submarine erosion on the eastern side. The shelf may have formed through wave erosion during periods of low sea level; other islands in the South Sandwich Islands have similar shelves. Saunders Bank may be an eroded island that subsided over time. Two northeast-southwest trending rows of seamounts are found north and southwest of Saunders Island; the northern consists of 480-metre (1,570 ft) deep Minke Seamount, 344-metre (1,129 ft) deep Orca Seamount and 75-metre (246 ft) deep Humpback Seamount, the southern of Saunders Island itself, 276-metre (906 ft) deep Fin Seamount and 400-metre (1,300 ft) deep Southern Right Seamount. Saunders Island reaches a width of 55 kilometres (34 mi) at 2,500 metres (8,200 ft) depth, and several submerged ridges extend from it.

Saunders Island has yielded basaltic rocks, andesite is rare. Basaltic andesite may be an older rock. The basalts contain sometimes olivine; phenocrysts include augite, hypersthene and plagioclase. Dolerite and gabbro have been found, and some volcanic rocks form palagonite.

== Eruption history ==
Older, more eroded rocks crop out at Carey Point and Nattriss Point. Traces of former fumarolic activity are found at the northern plains. Pahoehoe and aa lava flows were recently emplaced on the northern sector of the island, surrounding the former shore cliffs and sea stacks that constitute the Yellowstone Crags, and forming the Blackstone Plain and Ollivant Point; they may have been erupted from the northern flank in the late 19th/early 20th century. An ice gully described in 1931 was gone from images published in 2001 and may have formed during a 19th-20th century eruption. Discrepancies in maps may imply that eruptions occurred in the Ashen Hills after 1820. Dark coloured layers of volcanic ash are embedded within the ice, presumably from explosive eruptions.

Hot ground is found at both the summit crater and the southeastern crater. An ice tunnel in the caldera was filled with steam haze in 2001. Gas is visibly emitted from the southeastern crater, which was reported to be ice-free in 2013. Renewed activity in the southeastern crater in 2006 generated a steam plume and the crater grew in size. Steaming ground was seen close to the coast in 2020. Activity is difficult to observe due to the weather conditions, hence it is assumed that eruptions are ongoing whenever there is evidence for activity within a ten-month timespan.

Mount Michael is active, with fumarolic activity in the summit crater and occasional Strombolian eruptions that eject rocks to distances of several hundred metres and deposit tephra on the eastern flanks. Vapour emissions have been reported since 1820 and often hide the summit crater from view. Remote sensing has identified a lava lake in the summit crater of Mount Michael with a surface area of about 0.01 square kilometres (0.0039 sq mi). The lake is mostly covered by a relatively cold crust (temperatures of a few hundred degrees Celsius) but the lava has temperatures of about 989–1,279 °C (1,812–2,334 °F). It fluctuates in size over time. The volcano emits at least 145±59 tons per day of sulfur dioxide and about 179±76 tons per day of carbon dioxide. Rime ice forms cauliflower-shaped masses on the summit, probably on top of fumaroles.

== Ecosystem ==
The South Sandwich Islands have a polar climate, with a transition to a colder climate southward at Saunders. Storms and snowfall are frequent. Between July and November sea ice is common. Lichens are widespread. Algae and nodding thread-moss form large colonies on the northern plains, the former in particular around penguin colonies. Overall however, the island is largely barren of vegetation. Numerous fish species have been recorded in the waters off Saunders, as well as cephalopods, crustaceans and holothurians.

Various bird species nest on Saunders Island, with the Ashen Hills and coastal areas of the extreme north and west of the island featuring large bird colonies. Adelie penguins, black-bellied storm petrels, brown skuas, cape petrels, chinstrap penguins, Dominican gulls, gentoo penguins, macaroni penguins, snow petrels, southern fulmars, Wilson's storm petrels breed on the island, chinstrap penguins form a breeding population of more than 100,000 couples. Antarctic terns, king penguins and southern giant petrels visit the island, but without evidence of breeding. Antarctic fur seals and southern elephant seals are mammals that reproduce on Saunders Island, while Weddell seals have been observed but not while reproducing. Penguin colonies occur mostly in the ice-free coastal areas, such as the Ashen Hills and Blackstone Plain. Volcanic activity has caused mass mortalities in penguin colonies.

A marine protected area was established around the South Sandwich Islands in 2012, with further areas added in 2019. Marine debris has been reported from the beaches of Saunders Island. It consists mostly of driftwood but there is also man-made debris.

== See also ==
- List of Antarctic and sub-Antarctic islands
