= Blackstone Plain =

Coordinates: 57°45′S 26°28′W

Blackstone Plain is a small plain just south of Harper Point at the north end of Saunders Island, South Sandwich Islands. This lowland feature is made up of dark basaltic lavas and, in 1964, personnel from HMS Protector found it to be the only area of the island free from ice and snow. The descriptive name was given by the UK Antarctic Place-Names Committee in 1971.
