= Bristol Island =

Island in the South Sandwich Islands

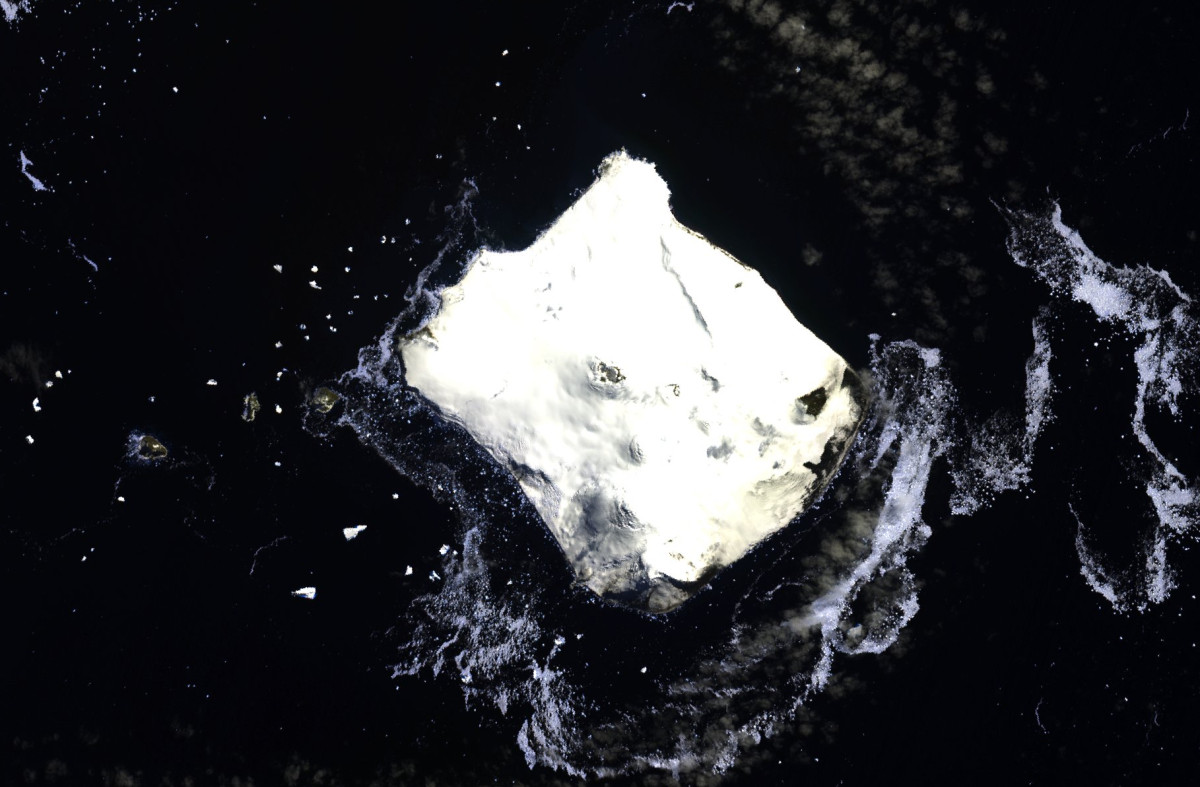
- NASA Terra ASTER image of Bristol Island

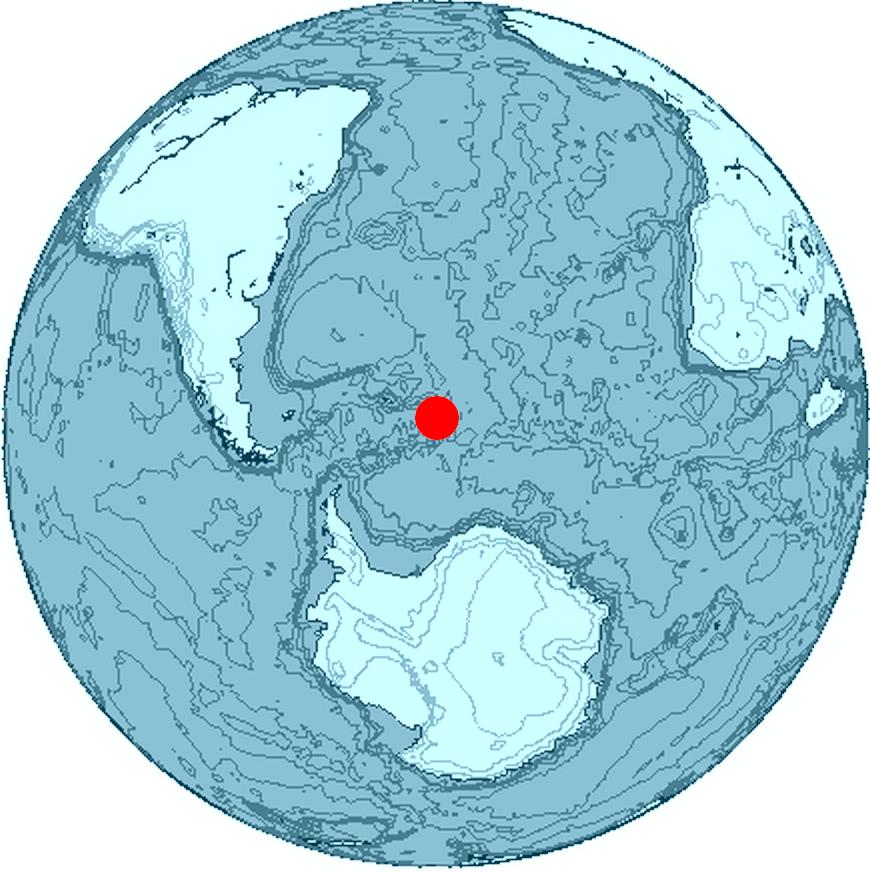
- Location of Bristol Island

Geography
- Coordinates: 59°01′S 26°32′W
- Archipelago: South Sandwich Islands (Central Islands)
- Length: 10.5 km (6.52 mi)
- Width: 10.9 km (6.77 mi)
- Highest elevation: 1,100 m (3600 ft)
- Highest point: Mount Darnley

Administration
- United Kingdom
- Overseas territory: South Georgia and the South Sandwich Islands

Demographics
- Population: Uninhabited

Bristol Island is an uninhabited island in the South Sandwich Islands, an archipelago in the Southern Ocean. The island is almost entirely surrounded by ice cliffs and largely covered with ice. It features both the oldest rocks of this archipelago and an active volcano that last erupted in 2016.

== Geography and geomorphology ==
Bristol Island is one of the South Sandwich Islands, which lie southeast of South Georgia in the Southern Ocean and extend over a distance of 350 kilometres (220 mi) in a north–south direction. It lies about 60 kilometres (37 mi) southwest of Montagu Island and is separated from Southern Thule by Forsters Passage. The first island of the South Sandwich Islands to be discovered was Freezland Rock, which was sighted on 31 January 1775 by a sailor named Freezland on James Cook's HMS Resolution. Cook considered Bristol Island to be a promontory on a larger island; it was Thaddeus von Bellingshausen who in 1819 determined that Bristol was actually an island. The island is almost inaccessible and thus among the most poorly studied of the South Sandwich Islands.

Bristol Island has dimensions of 10.5 by 10.9 kilometres (6.5 by 6.8 mi), making it one of the largest in the South Sandwich Islands. It is roughly the shape of a square and almost entirely covered in ice. The points of the square are formed by the island's northernmost Fryer Point (Spanish: Punta Teniente Santi), easternmost Trulla Bluff (Spanish: Punta Peñón), southernmost Harker Point, and the westernmost Turmoil Point. Turmoil Point is a distinctive landmark when viewed from the west of the island, rising to an elevation of 400 m and culminating in a snow-covered summit while Trulla Bluff is a bluff that is also ice-covered and high in elevation.

In some places the coast is formed by sandy or bouldery beaches, but most of Bristol Island is surrounded by ice cliffs. They reach heights of 70 to 100 metres (230 to 330 ft) and emanate from an interior that features several ridges and peaks. Bristol Island has three mountains in its interior, the western Mount Sourabaya close to the centre of the island, the southern Mount Darnley and the eastern Havfruen Peak, which together form a horseshoe. Of these Mount Darnley is the highest point of Bristol Island, reaching an elevation of 1,100 metres (3,600 ft) above sea level. Mount Sourabaya reaches 915 metres (3,002 ft); Havfruen Peak is 365 metres (1,198 ft) or 490 metres (1,610 ft) high and may be a lava dome or a parasitic vent. Pyroclastic cones and three overlapping vents form Mount Sourabaya, the active centre of Bristol Island.

=== Surrounding features ===
Several small islets occur all around Bristol Island. The largest ones (more than 1 km, 0.62 mi) lie all west of Turmoil Point and consist of Grindle Rock, Wilson Rock and Freezland Rock. Grindle Rock (Spanish: Roca Cerretti) has a height of 213 metres (700 ft) and lies 0.7 nautical miles (1.3 km) west of the island. It is the easternmost of the chain of rocks extending WSW from Turmoil Point, the westernmost point of Bristol Island. Wilson Rock has a height of 183 m and lies 1.4 nautical miles (2.6 km) west of Bristol Island and in the middle of the three chain of rocks. Freezland Rock has a height of 305 metres (1,000 ft) high and is located 2 nautical miles (4 km) west of the island, also forming the westernmost of the chain of rocks.

These islets and numerous sea stacks formed through coastal erosion. The submarine portion of Bristol Island has an irregular shape, especially in the north and west where it extends to some distance from the coastline. A shallow shelf of less than 180 metres (590 ft) depth surrounds the island especially in the west, where it forms Freezland Bank. Towards the seafloor, Bristol Island widens to a diameter of 90 kilometres (56 mi). Numerous submarine sector collapse scars surround the island especially on its southern side, while a ridge and a secondary seamount and secondary volcanism lie due west and extend 14 kilometres (8.7 mi) from Bristol.

== Geology ==
East of the South Sandwich Islands, the South America Plate subducts beneath the Scotia Plate at a rate of 70 millimetres per year (2.8 in/year). The subduction is responsible for the existence of the South Sandwich island arc, which is constituted by about eleven islands in an eastward curving chain, and submarine volcanoes including Protector in the north and Adventure and Kemp in the south. From north to south, the islands are Zavodovski Island, Leskov Island, Visokoi Island, Candlemas Island–Vindication Island, Saunders Island, Montagu Island, Bristol Island–Freezland Rock, Bellingshausen Island, and Cook Island–Thule Island. Most of the islands are stratovolcanoes of various sizes.

=== Composition ===
The principal volcanic rock of Bristol Island is basalt. Freezland Rock consists of andesite which – unlike the potassium-poor tholeiites of the main island – defines a calc-alkaline suite. Phenocrysts in both series include augite, hypersthene, olivine and plagioclase. Tyrrel suspected that schists found encased in an iceberg may come from Bristol Island. Isotope ratios of hafnium imply that the magma was formed with involvement of subducted pelagic sediments.

== Discovery ==
The three rocks lying west of the island, Grindle, Wilson, and Freezland, were all first discovered by the expedition of British Captain James Cook in 1775. Grindle rock was recharted in 1930 by Discovery Investigations personnel on the Discovery II and named by them for Sir Gilbert E.A. Grindle, Permanent Under-Secretary of State for the British Colonies. Wilson rock was later more accurately charted by Admiral Thaddeus Bellingshausen in 1819–20 and recharted again in 1930 by DI personnel on the Discovery II who named it for Sir Samuel H. Wilson, Permanent Under-Secretary of State for British Colonies. Freezland rock was originally named "Freezland Peak" by Captain Cook on his 1775 expedition after Samuel Freezland, the seaman who first sighted it and so discovered the South Sandwich group. Cook's chart, showing the feature as an insular rock, was verified in 1930 by Discovery Investigations personnel on the Discovery II and the terminology had been altered accordingly from "peak" to "rock".

Of the island's points, Turmoil Point was named by United Kingdom Antarctic Place-Names Committee (UK-APC) for the violent air streams commonly encountered during flying operations from HMS seas typical of the locality. Trulla Bluff was initially named "Glacier Bluff" during the survey of the island by RRS to avoid duplication. The new name refers to the Norwegian whaling vessel Trulla which visited the islands in 1911. Fryer Point was charted in 1930 by Discovery Investigations personnel on the Discovery II and named for Lieutenant Commander D.H. Fryer, Royal Navy, captain of H.M. Surveying Ship Fitzroy. Although the island was discovered by a British expedition under James Cook in 1775, Harker Point was unnamed until it was surveyed in 1930 by a team on the staff of the Discovery Committee.

== Eruption history ==
The oldest rock in the South Sandwich Islands is found at Bristol Island: A sample from Freezland Rock has yielded an age of 3.1±0.1 million years by potassium-argon dating. It, the rocks at Turmoil Point and the stacks between them may be part of an older, now eroded volcano made up by alternating dykes, lava flows and tuffs. The bulk of Bristol Island was probably built by emissions from the Sourabaya, Darnley and Havfruen centres and includes lava flows that form some of the capes, although bathymetric data imply that it mostly pre-dates the Freezland Rock volcano.

Recorded activity at Bristol goes back 150 years. Eruptions have been observed in 1823, 1935-1936, 1950 and 1956, and traces of very recent eruptions in 1964. A steaming crater was reported in 1962 which is presently buried under snow and ice. The eruptions produced scoria cones and reached volcanic explosivity indexes of 2-3. Historical eruptions have been centered on Mount Sourabaya and a crater on the western flank. The activity on Bristol Island led the Argentines in 1956 to abandon the refuge hut they had installed on Thule Island farther south, causing them to drop their plan to establish a permanent base there. A sulfate anomaly in the EPICA ice core from Dronning Maud Land, Antarctica, has been attributed to the 1956 eruption. Tephra layers in the East Antarctic Ice Sheet - such as in an ice core from Siple Dome - may come from the 1935 eruption although an origin at Cerro Azul in Chile is also possible.

In 2005, three overlapping craters cropped out from the ice at Mount Sourabaya, with another crater 1 kilometre (0.62 mi) farther east. During April-July 2016, an eruption at Mount Sourabaya emplaced two lava flows and produced ash emissions that were visible from satellites and led to the issuance of volcanic ash advisories. Temperature anomalies indicative of fumaroles are visible from satellites and are centered on the crater of Mount Sourabaya. Helicopter-assisted ascents to the summit of Mount Sourabaya have found hot ground. Ice is melted in the proximity of active craters but otherwise volcanic impacts on the ice cover are minimal.

== Ecology ==
Algae and lichens grow where there is exposed rock, but unlike on many other South Sandwich Islands no vegetation is associated with volcanically heated ground. Bryophytes including mosses have been recovered from Freezland Rock. Penguins form colonies on Bristol Island, including one with thousands of individuals on Freezland Rock, and seabirds like Antarctic fulmars and imperial shags also breed on Bristol, although their populations are smaller here than on the other South Sandwich Islands and they may be impacted by volcanic activity. Penguin colonies are concentrated on headlands where the island is not ice covered. Isopods occur in supralittoral pools. Bryozoans have been recovered from shallow waters around Bristol.

== See also ==
- List of Antarctic and sub-Antarctic islands
- List of volcanoes in South Sandwich Islands
