= Harper Point =

Harper Point (57°45′S 26°29′W) is a point just north of Blackstone Plain forming the north end of Saunders Island in the South Sandwich Islands. It was charted in 1930 by Discovery Investigations personnel on the Discovery II and named for F.H. Harper, Secretary to the Discovery Committee.
