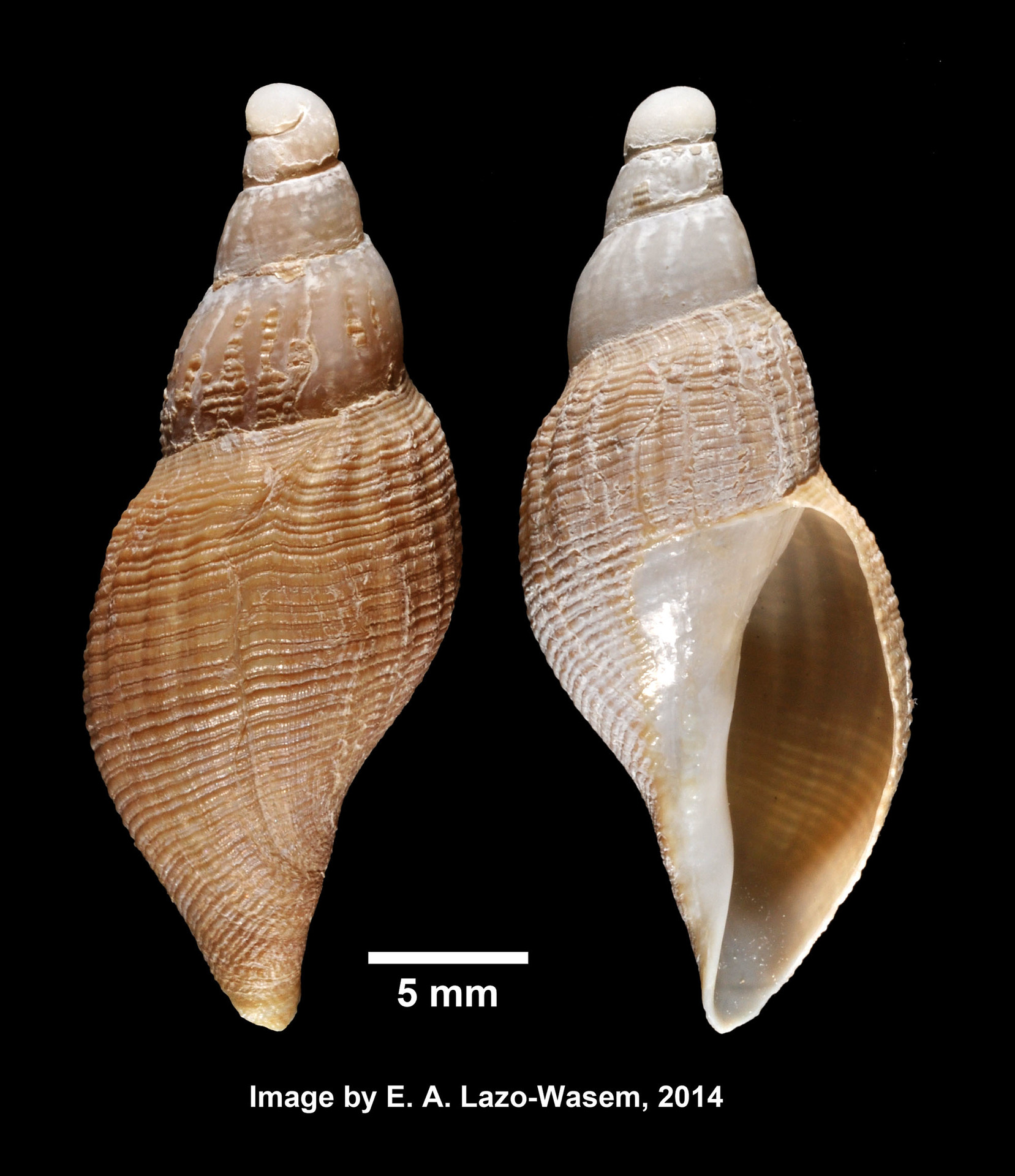
- Original image of a shell of Pleurotomella anomalapex

Scientific classification
- Kingdom: Animalia
- Phylum: Mollusca
- Class: Gastropoda
- Subclass: Caenogastropoda
- Order: Neogastropoda
- Superfamily: Conoidea
- Family: Raphitomidae
- Genus: Pleurotomella
- Species: P. anomalapex

Binomial name
- Pleurotomella anomalapex Powell, 1951

Synonyms
- Oenopota anomalapex Figueira and Absalão, 2010; Pleurotomella (Anomalotomella) anomalapex Powell, 1951· accepted, alternate representation; Propebela anomalapex Castellanos and Landoni, 1993

= Pleurotomella anomalapex =

Species of gastropod

Pleurotomella anomalapex is a species of sea snail, a marine gastropod mollusk in the family Raphitomidae.

== Description ==
The length of the shell attains 7.8 millimetres (0.31 in).

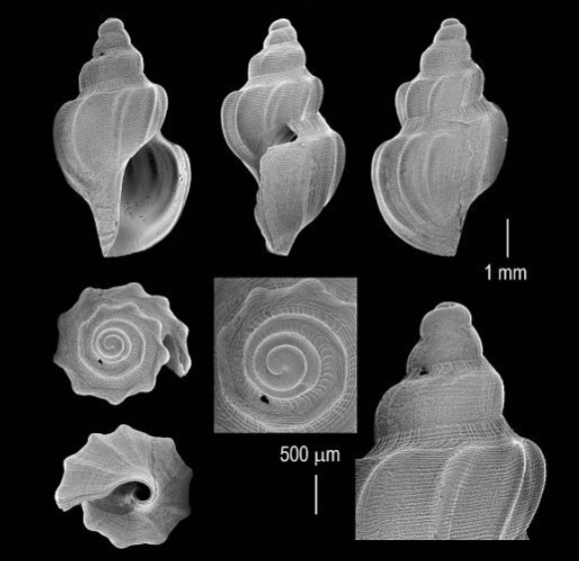
Shell and protoconch of Pleurotomella anomalapex (specimen at the Smithsonian Institution)

== Distribution ==
This marine species occurs off the Falkland Islands and Patagonia; off the South Sandwich Islands and the Scotia Sea.
