= Mount Sourabaya =

Mountain in the South Sandwich Islands

Mount Sourabaya (59°00′50″S 26°32′43″W) is a 915-metre (3,002 ft) volcano 1 nautical mile (1.9 km) northwest of Mount Darnley on Bristol Island in the South Sandwich Islands. Named by United Kingdom Antarctic Place-Names Committee (UK-APC) in 1971, its name refers to the whaling factory ship Sourabaya, from which an eruption was witnessed in 1935.

The most recent eruption of Mount Sourabaya began between 19 April and 23 April 2016.
