= Davis Bank =

Davis Bank may refer to:

- Davis Bank (Nantucket), a feature of Nantucket Shoals in Massachusetts, USA.
- Davis Bank (Belize), a former estate in Belize City, Belize.
- Davis Bank (Scotia Arc), part of the island arc system between South America and Antarctica.
