= West Scotia Basin =

The Scotia plate is shown in blue-green toward the bottom of this map. The West Scotia basin is on the left side of the plate.

The West Scotia Basin is an oceanic basin in the South Atlantic Ocean, near its border with the Southern Ocean. The basin is found southeast of Tierra del Fuego, south of the Falkland Islands and South Georgia, west of the South Sandwich Islands, north of the South Orkney Islands and northeast of the South Shetland Islands and Antarctic Peninsula. It forms the western portion of the Scotia Plate.

The basin's floor is covered by a variety of minerals, likely to be volcanically or glacially derived. Dredge sites from the West Scotia Ridge primarily yielded basaltic rocks (eg. lava, hyaloclastites) along with smaller quantities of granitoids, metasedimentary rocks and gneiss. Recovered samples from the North Scotia Ridge contained glacial striations, such as pelite, sandstone, paragneiss, granitoids, biotite-quartz schists, porphyrites and tonalite.
