= Havfruen Peak =

Mountain in South Sandwich Islands

Havfruen Peak (59°2′S 26°32′W) is a peak in the eastern part of Bristol Island, South Sandwich Islands. It is 365 metres (1,200 ft) high and is conspicuous from both north and south. It was named by the UK Antarctic Place-Names Committee in 1971 after the Norwegian barque Havfruen which was damaged by ice and sank off the South Sandwich Islands on December 1, 1911.
