= Ashen Hills =

Mountains in South Georgia and the South Sandwich Islands

The Ashen Hills (57°48′S 26°43′W) are a ridge of rounded hills of gullied ash terminating in Nattriss Point at the southeast end of Saunders Island, South Sandwich Islands. The name applied by the United Kingdom Antarctic Place-Names Committee in 1971 refers to the ashy composition and pale color of the hills.
