= Forsters Passage =

Body of water separating Bristol and Bellingshausen Islands in the South Atlantic

Forsters Passage (Spanish: Pasaje Forster) (59°15′S 26°50′W) is a body of water between Bristol Island and Southern Thule in the South Sandwich Islands. In 1775, a British expedition under James Cook gave the name "Forster's Bay", after John R. Forster, a naturalist with the expedition, to what appeared to be a bay in essentially this position. The "bay" was determined to be a strait by a Russian expedition under Fabian Gottlieb von Bellingshausen in 1820.
