= Lava lake =

Molten rock contained in a geological depression

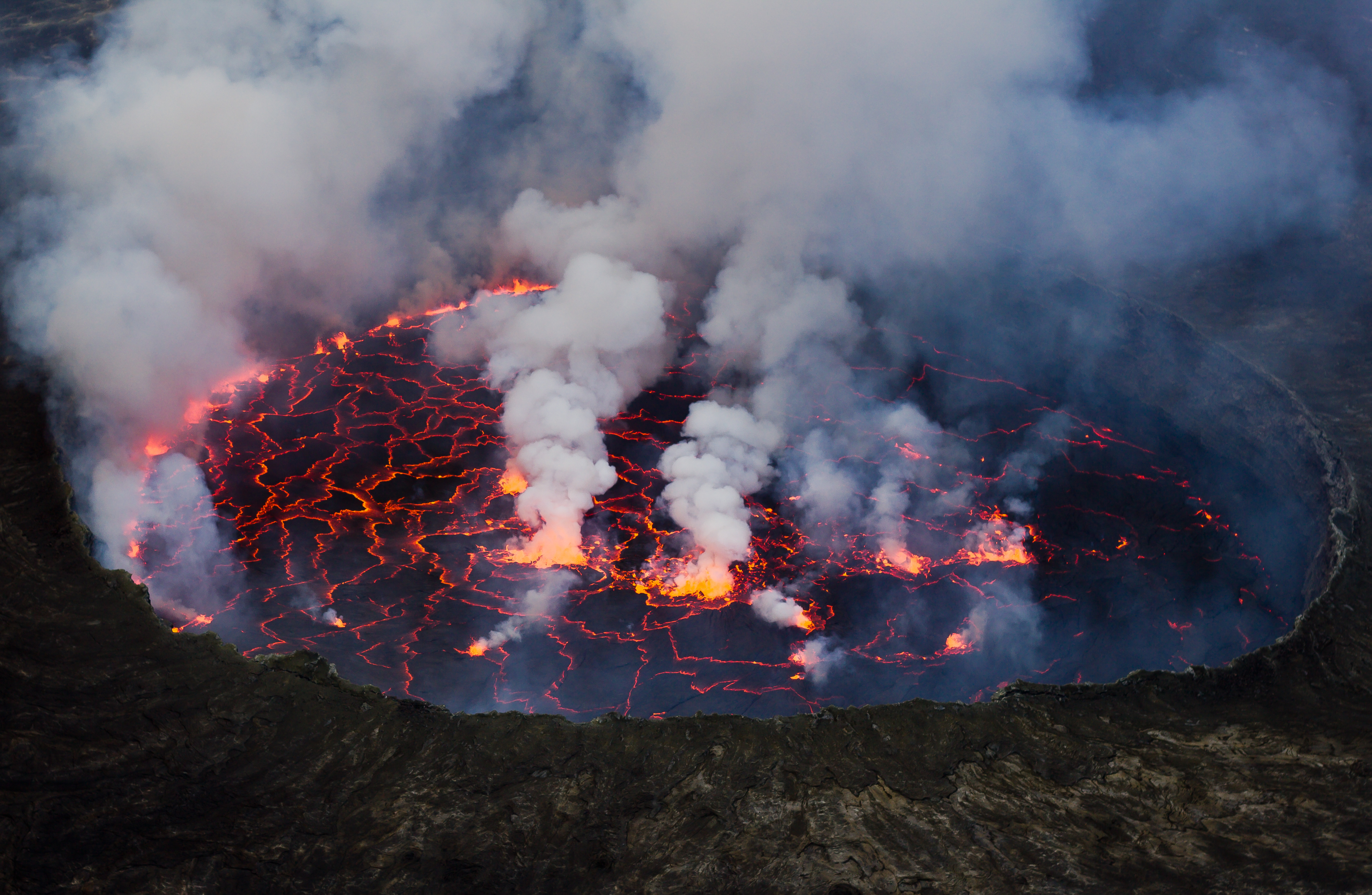
Lava lake at Nyiragongo Volcano in a molten state. (Democratic Republic of the Congo)

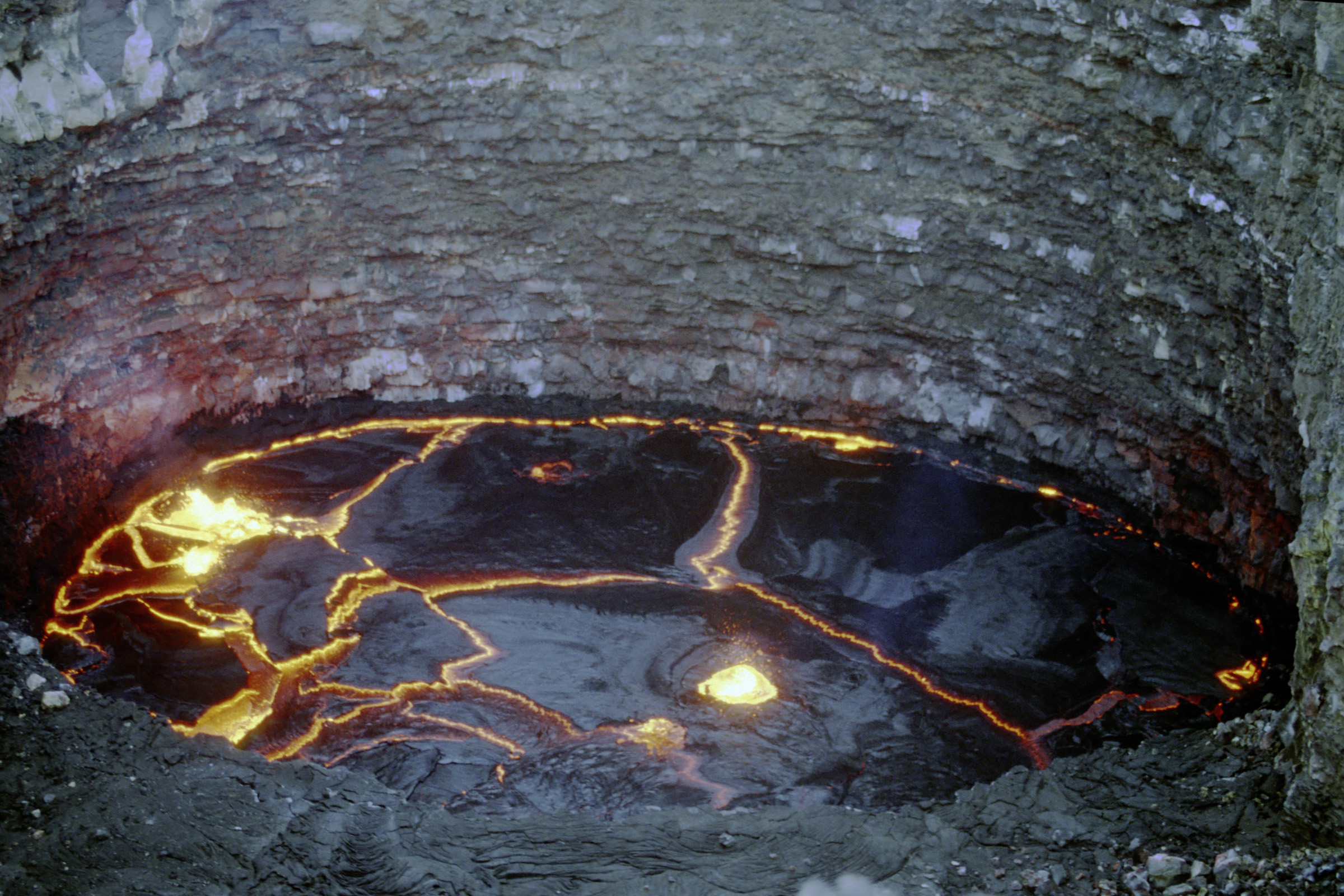
Lava lake at Erta Ale Volcano, Ethiopia.

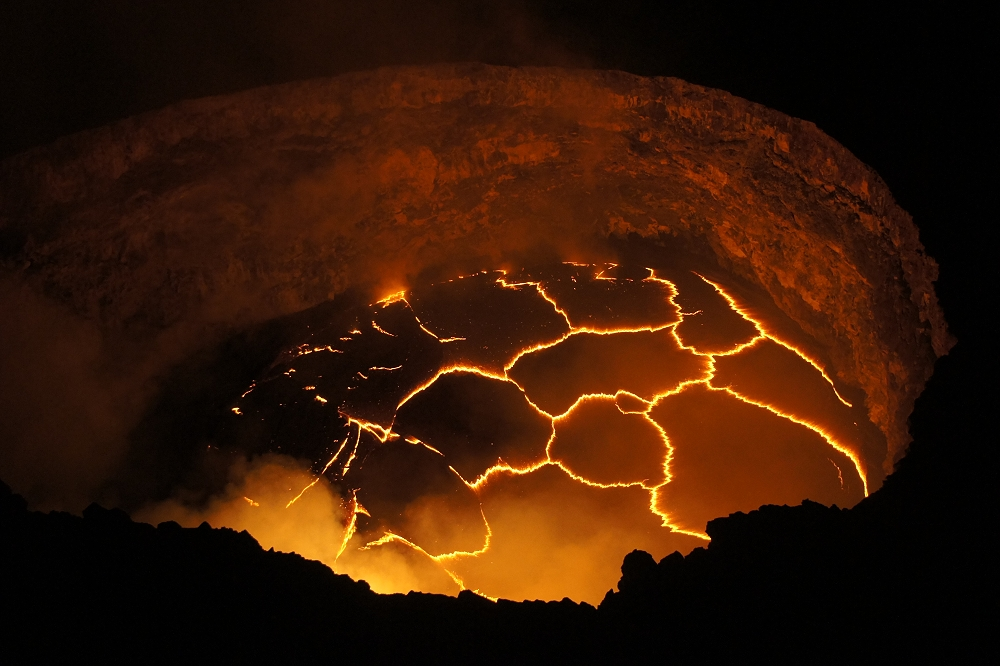
The lava lake of Halemaʻumaʻu at Kīlauea, Hawaiʻi, United States).

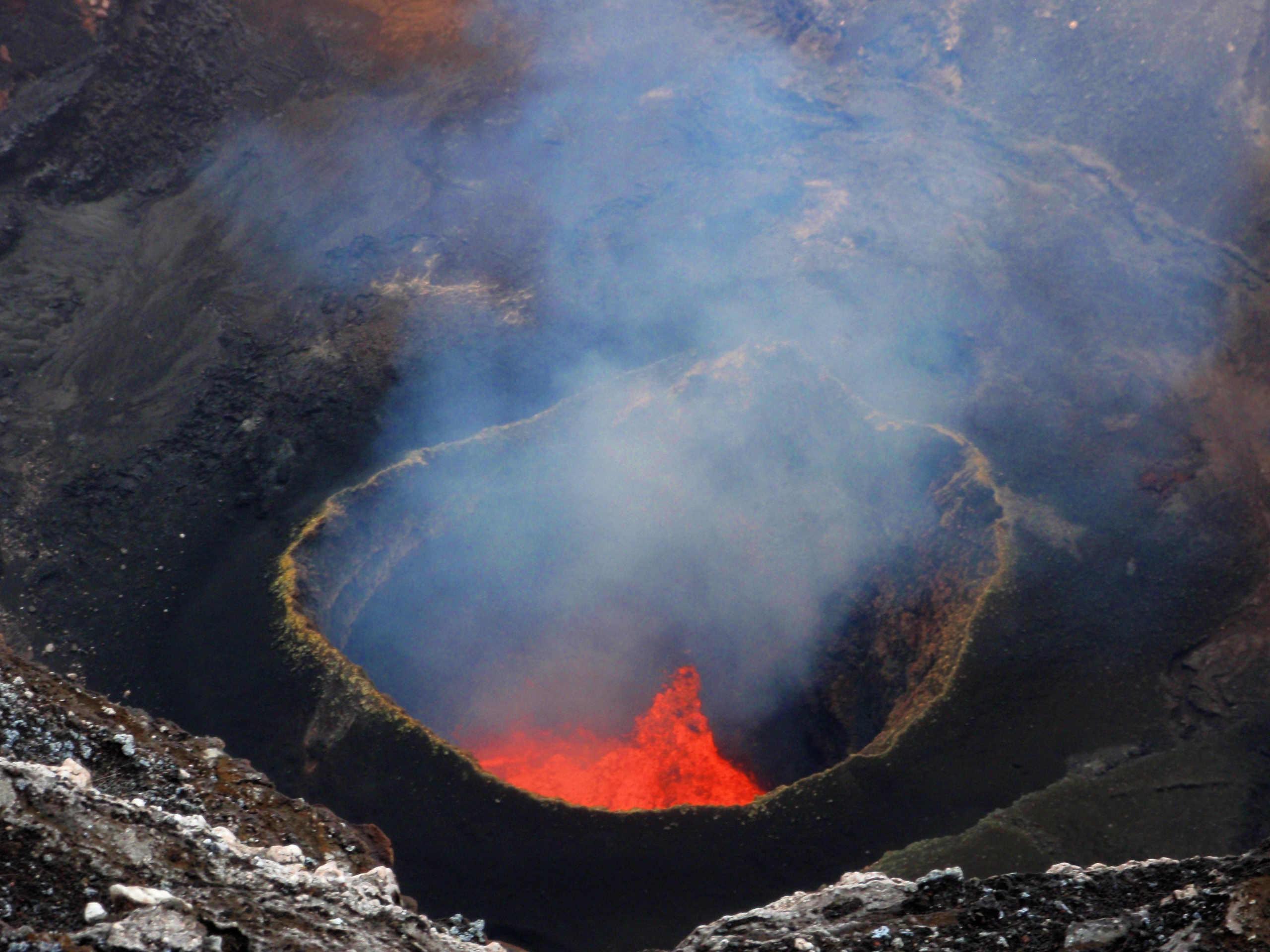
Lava lake in Marum crater, Ambrym, Vanuatu.

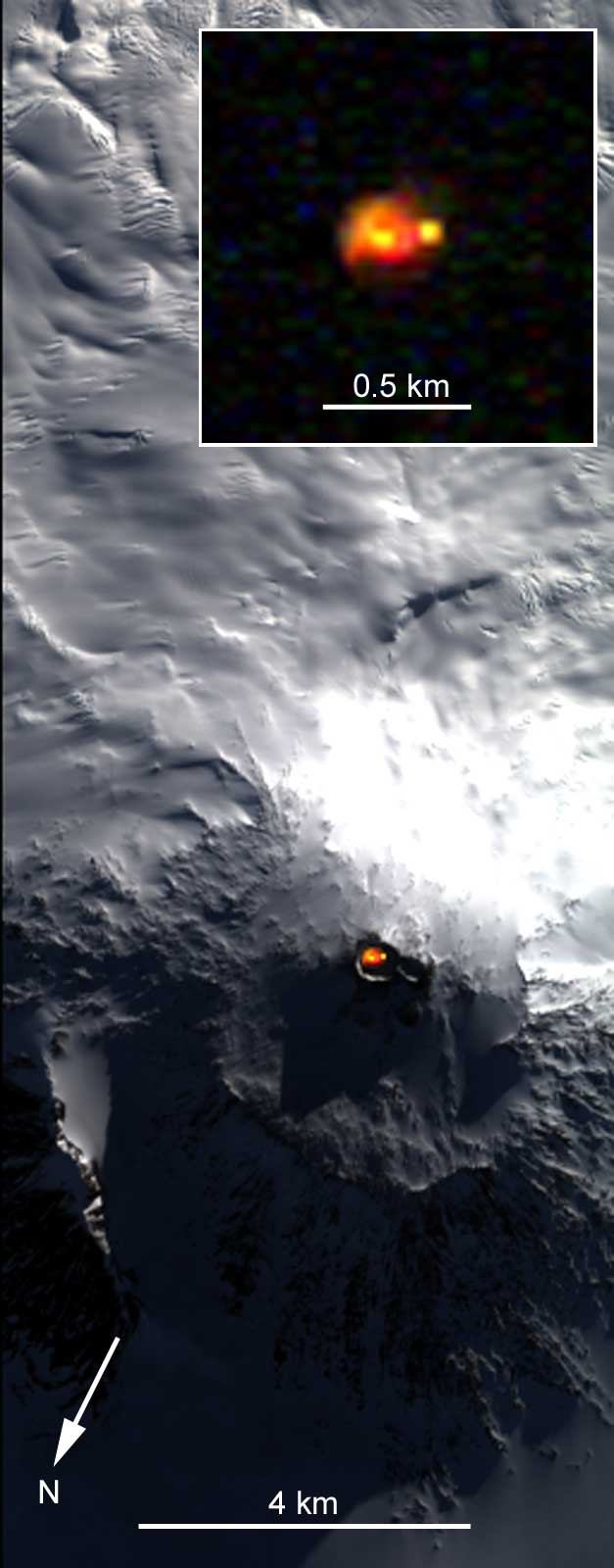
Satellite picture showing the lava lake of Mount Erebus, Antarctica.

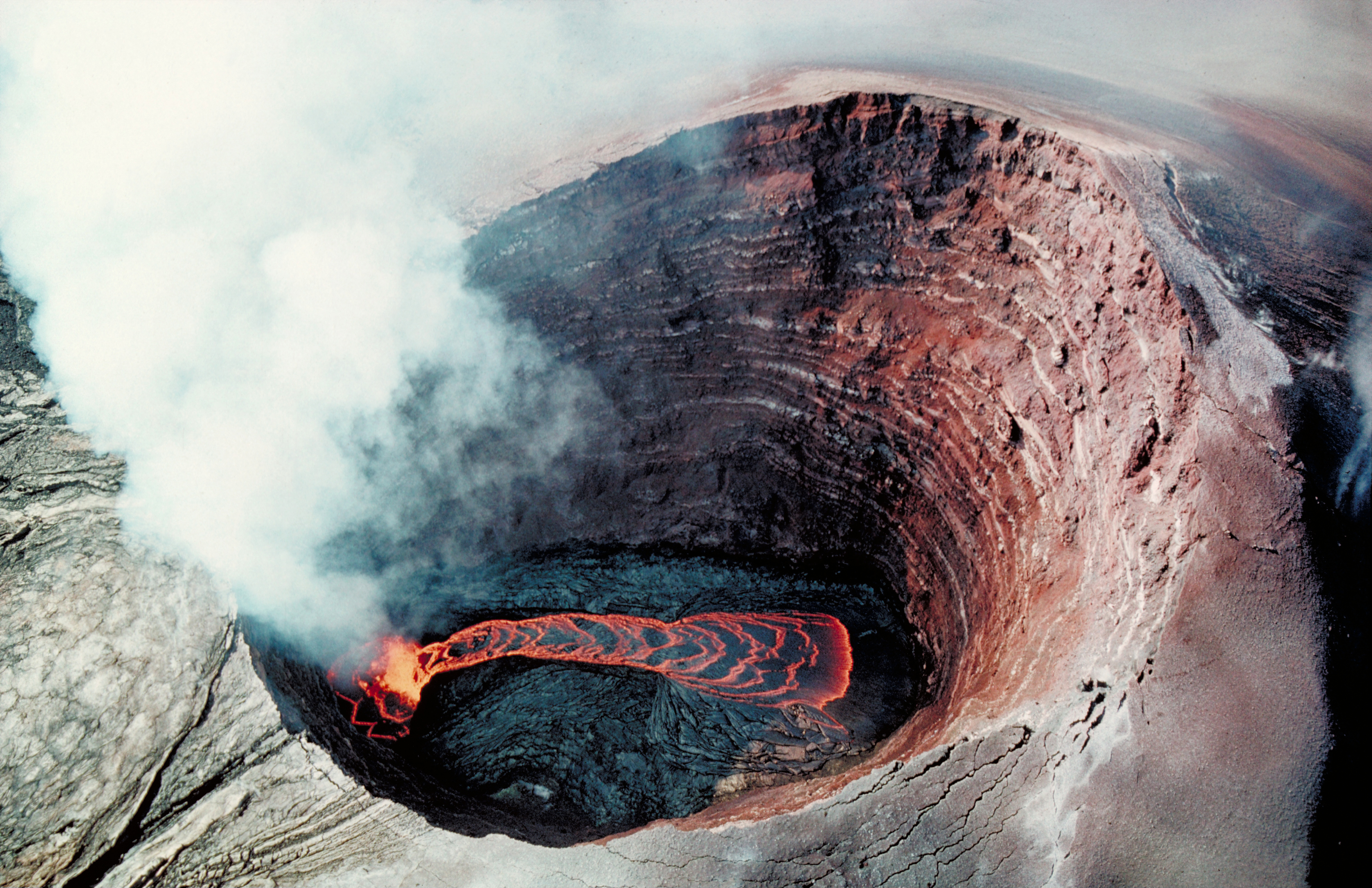
Aerial view of a lava lake in Pu’u ’Ō’ō crater, east rift zone of Kīlauea. The crater is about 820 ft (250 m) in diameter.

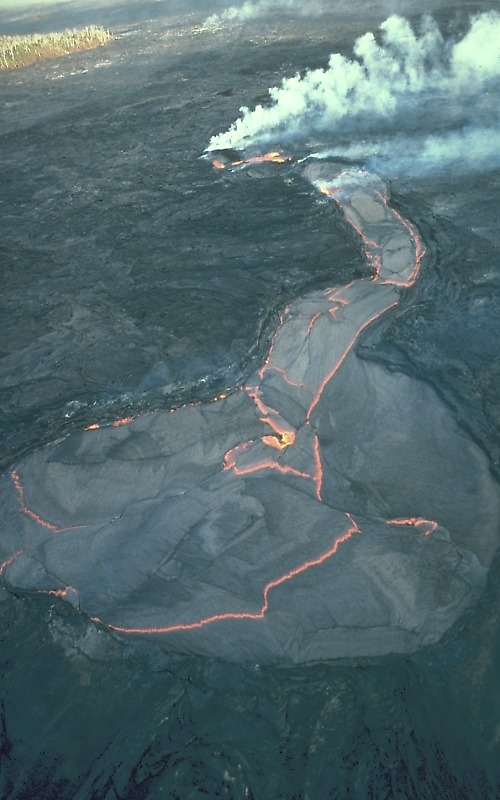
Aerial view of a lava lake atop the Kūpaʻianahā vent on the east rift zone of Kīlauea volcano.

Lava lakes are large volumes of molten lava, usually basaltic, contained in a volcanic vent, crater, or broad depression. The term is used to describe both lava lakes that are wholly or partly molten and those that are solidified (sometimes referred to as frozen lava lakes).

== Formation ==
Lava lakes can form in three ways:

- Vents in a crater erupt enough lava to partially fill the crater with lava;
- Molten lava from the surroundings flows into a broad land depression to partially fill it with lava;
- A new vent that erupts lava continuously for a period of several weeks or more and slowly builds a crater progressively higher than the surrounding ground.

=== Behaviors ===
On Earth, lava lakes occur in a variety of volcanic systems, ranging from the basaltic Erta Ale lake in Ethiopia and the basaltic andesite volcano of Villarrica, Chile, to the unique phonolitic lava lake at Mt. Erebus, Antarctica. Lava lakes have been observed to exhibit a range of behaviours. A "constantly circulating, apparently steady-state" lava lake was observed during the 1969–1971 Mauna Ulu eruption of Kīlauea, Hawaiʻi. By contrast, a lava lake at the 1983–1984 Puʻu ʻŌʻō eruption of Kilauea displayed cyclic behaviour with a period of 5–20 minutes; gas "pierced the surface" of the lake, and the lava rapidly drained back down the conduit before the onset of a new phase of lake activity. The behaviour observed is influenced by the combined effects of pressure within the reservoir, exsolution and decompression of gas bubbles within the conduit and, potentially, exsolution of bubbles within the magma reservoir. Superimposed upon this is the effect of bubbles rising through the liquid, and coalescence of bubbles within the conduit. The interactions of these effects can create either a steady-state recirculating lake, or a lake level that periodically rises and then falls.

== Notable examples ==
Persistent lava lakes are a rare phenomenon. Only a few volcanoes have been observed to host persistent or near-persistent lava lakes during recent decades:

- Mount Erebus, Ross Island, Antarctica
- Erta Ale, Ethiopia
- Kīlauea, Big Island, Hawaiʻi
- Masaya volcano, Nicaragua
- Mount Michael, Saunders Island, South Sandwich Islands
- Mount Nyiragongo, Democratic Republic of the Congo
- Mount Yasur, Vanuatu
- Tofua, Tonga

The lava lakes at Ambrym volcano disappeared after a large eruption in December 2018.

For many years, Kīlauea had two persistent lava lakes: one in the Halemaʻumaʻu vent cavity within the summit caldera, and another within the Puʻu ʻŌʻō cone located on the east rift zone of the volcano. In May 2018, both of these lava lakes disappeared as a result of increased activity in Kīlauea's east rift zone. The lava lake at Halemaʻumaʻu returned in December 2020, after Kīlauea's first eruption in over two years. The lava lake solidified after the eruption ended in May 2021, but returned again when eruptive activity at Halemaʻumaʻu resumed on September 29, 2021. Following the 2021 eruption, three more occurred on January 5, 2023; June 7, 2023; and September 10, 2023. As of December 2025, Halemaʻumaʻu is erupting episodically, however no lava lake has formed yet.

Nyiragongo's lava lake has usually been the largest and most voluminous in recent history, reaching 700 meters wide in 1982, although Masaya is believed to have hosted an even larger lava lake at the time of the Spanish conquest, being 1,000 meters wide in 1670. The lava lake at Masaya came back in January 2016.

In addition to the aforementioned persistent lava lakes, a certain number of occurrences of temporary lava lakes (sometimes called lava ponds or lava pools, depending on their size and nature) have also been observed and are listed in the following table.

== List of volcanoes having displayed past or present lava lake activity ==
Volcano	Location
Persistent or near-persistent lava lakes during recent decades
Erta Ale	Ethiopia
Mount Erebus	Ross Island, Antarctica
Kīlauea Halemaʻumaʻu	Hawaiʻi (Big Island)
Nyiragongo (the largest one in the past century)	Democratic Republic of the Congo
Mount Michael	Saunders Island, South Sandwich Islands
Ambrym (two lava lakes in both Benbow and Marum craters since around 1991; following an earthquake in December 2018 both lakes are buried under collapsed craters)	Ambrym Island, Vanuatu
Tofua (possibly in 2004 and 2006), lava lake sighted in 2023 and 2025.	Tofua Island, Tonga
Recent intermittent lava lake activity
Masaya	Nicaragua
Mount Yasur	Tanna Island, Vanuatu
Villarrica	Chile
Karthala	Grande Comore, Comoros
Piton de la Fournaise (small temporary lava pond in Dolomieu crater)	Réunion Island
Ol Doinyo Lengai (only active volcano in the world emitting carbonatite lava)	Tanzania
Turrialba (small lake)	Costa Rica
Unconfirmed lava lake activity
Telica (possibly in 1971 and 1999–2000)	Nicaragua
Tungurahua (possibly in 1999)	Ecuador
Nabro (possibly in 2012)	Eritrea
Lava lake activity suggested by satellite remote-sensing data
Mount Michael	Saunders Island, South Sandwich Islands
Mount Belinda	Montagu Island, South Sandwich Islands
Mawson Peak	Heard Island
Past lava lake activity
Kīlauea Puʻu ʻŌʻō crater (1983–2018, collapsed during the 2018 Puna eruption)	Hawaiʻi (Big Island)
Mount Matavanu (during the 1905–1911 eruption)	Savai'i Island, Samoa
Nyamuragira (lava lake located within the summit caldera, confirmed for the first time in 1921, drained in 1938, and temporary lava pond in the Kituro cone on the SW flank, during the 1948 eruption)	Democratic Republic of the Congo
Capelinhos (in 1958, a Surtseyan eruption)	Faial Island, Azores
Surtsey (in 1964, during the 1963–1967 eruption which led to the formation of the island)	Iceland
Tolbachik, part of the Klyuchevskaya volcanic complex (last observation of lava lake activity in 1964)	Kamchatka, Russia
Etna (in 1974)	Sicily, Italy
Ardoukôba (in 1978)	Djibouti
Mount Mihara (in 1986)	Izu Ōshima, Japan
Stromboli (in 1986 and 1989)	Aeolian Islands, Italy
La Cumbre (in 1995)	Fernandina Island, Galápagos
Pacaya (in 2000 and 2001)	Guatemala
Mount Edziza (0.9 million years ago)	British Columbia, Canada
Lava lake activity on other planetary bodies
Loki Patera	Io
Janus Patera	Io
Pele	Io

== See also ==
- Kīlauea Iki – solidified lava lake in a pit crater
- Types of volcanic eruptions
