= Mount Darnley =

Mountain in the South Sandwich Islands

Highest point
- Elevation: 1,160 m (3,810 ft)
- Prominence: 1,160 m (3,810 ft)
- Listing: Ribu

Mount Darnley (59°3′S 26°30′W) is a mountain, 1,160 metres (3,810 ft) high, in the south-central portion of Bristol Island in the South Sandwich Islands off Antarctica. It was charted in 1930 by Discovery Investigations personnel on the Discovery II, who named it for E.R. Darnley.
