= Scotia Arc =

Island arc system in the Southern Ocean

Coordinates: 57°30′S 40°00′W

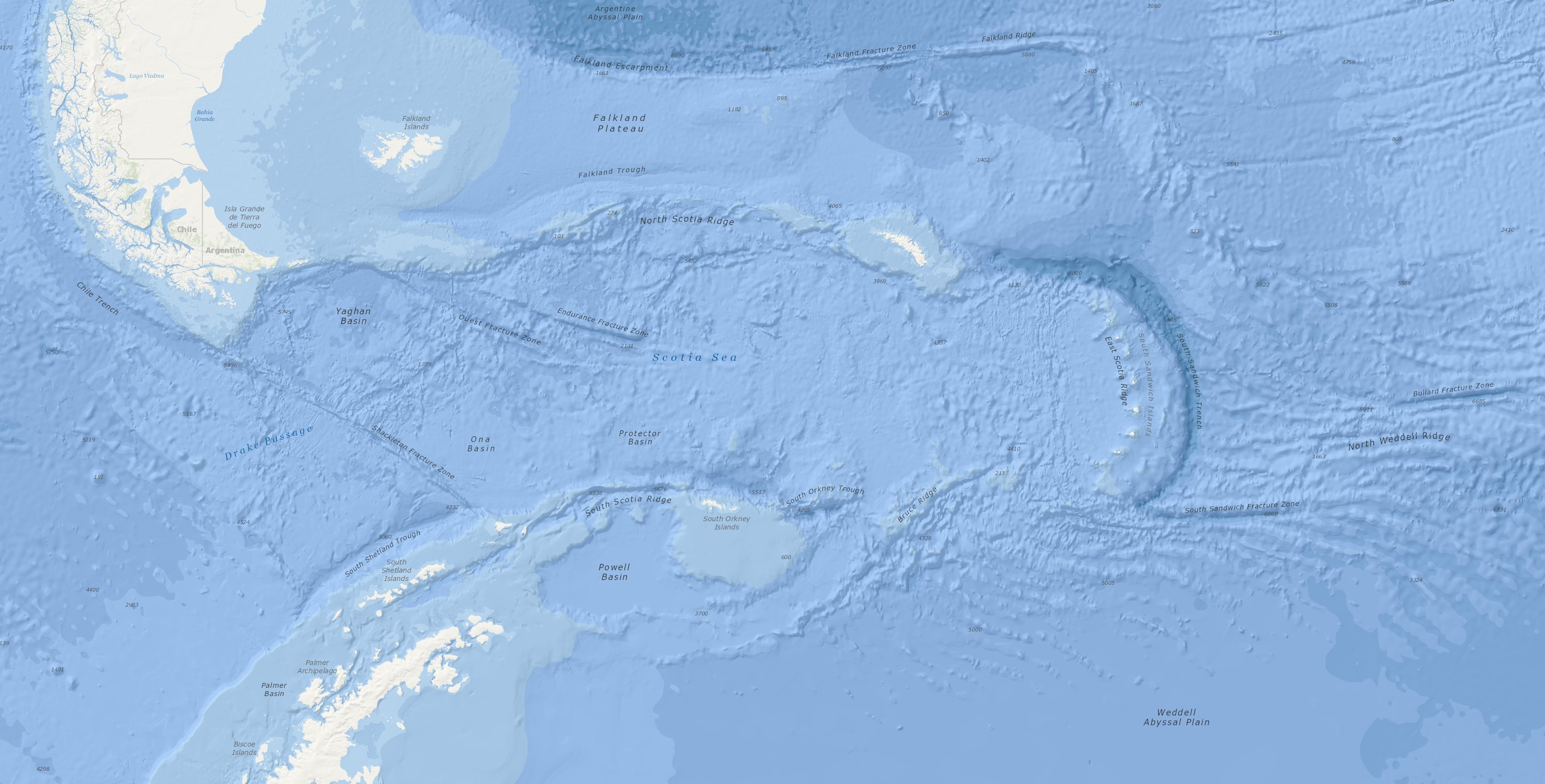
Bathymetry of the Scotia Arc

The Scotia Arc is the island arc system forming the north, east and south border of the Scotia Sea. The northern border, the North Scotia Ridge, comprises (from west to east): Isla de los Estados at the tip of Tierra del Fuego, the Burdwood, Davis, and Aurora Banks; the Shag, South Georgia Island and Clerke Rocks. The eastern border comprises the volcanic South Sandwich Islands flanked by the South Sandwich Trench. The southern border, the South Scotia Ridge, comprises (east to west): Herdman, Discovery, Bruce, Pirie, and Jane Banks; the South Orkney Islands and Elephant Island. Finally, the Bransfield Strait separates the arc from the South Shetland Islands and James Ross Island flanking the tip of the Antarctic Peninsula.

The Scotia Arc surrounds the small Scotia and South Sandwich Plates. The arc is formed by continental fragments that once formed a land bridge between South America and Antarctica, which was once part of the subduction margin that still forms the Andes. An ancestral arc, which formed a separate subduction system, broke through this land bridge and started to form the Scotia Sea by eastward back-arc extension driven by subduction of the South American Plate (also located east of the Scotia Arc). Today, the Scotia Arc forms a discontinuous link between South America and Antarctica. It is considered a continuation of the Andes, and the antarctic part of that mountain range is called the Antarctandes. The Scotia Arc is also an important barrier between the Pacific and Atlantic Oceans, and therefore for the Antarctic Circumpolar Current.

== Geology ==
The formation of the Scotia Arc was initiated by an acceleration in South America's westward migration in the mid-Cretaceous (120 to 83 million years ago, Ma) which led to the uplift of the Fuegan Andes and the then adjacent and embryonic North Scotia Ridge. The uplift of the ridge initiated the eastward migration of the South Georgia microcontinent from Tierra del Fuego towards its current location. In the Late Cretaceous South America started to move west relative to Antarctica.

Little changed in the region between the Late Cretaceous and Oligocene (90-30 Ma) except for the subduction of the Phoenix Plate on the Pacific margin of the land bridge that still connected South America and Antarctica — what would become the Drake Passage was at this time a cusp on the Pacific side of the land bridge.

The Late Paleocene to the Early Eocene (55 Ma) saw rift basin formation in the Fuegan Andes which led to crustal extension: the first sign of separation between the two continents and the formation of the South Scotia Sea and South Scotia Ridge. Spreading in the West Scotia Sea led to the further lengthening of the North Scotia Ridge and South Georgia moving further east. Spreading in the West Scotia Sea also finally led to the rifting of the South Orkney microcontinent from the tip of the Antarctic Peninsula. This event initiated the South Scotia Ridge.

The banks of the South Scotia Ridge are made of continental crust that rifted off the land bridge 40-30 Ma. The banks on the northern Central Scotia Sea, on the other hand, are volcanic constructs overlaying an oceanic basement. Parts of this basement form the spreading centre of the separation between South America and Antarctica.

Seafloor spreading in the West Scotia Sea continued until 6.6-5.9 Ma. The oldest volcanic activity in the Central and Eastern Scotia Sea, i.e. the first signs of a volcanic arc, has been dated to 28.5 Ma. The South Sandwich Islands fore-arc originated in the Central Scotia Sea and was translated eastward by the back-arc spreading centre in the East Scotia Sea, i.e. the East Scotia Ridge. South Georgia's eastward migration ended about 9 Ma when the microcontinent collided with the Northeast Georgia Rise large igneous province on the South American Plate, north-east of South Georgia. A submerged equivalent to the current South Sandwich Arc was relocated westward by the same spreading centre. After, and probably because of, the collision, the East Scotia Sea spreading centre split the ancestral South Sandwich Arc leaving a remnant arc under the Central Scotia Sea. The collision also produced the rugged Allardyce Range on South Georgia, making the 3,000 m (9,800 ft)-high range three times higher than the conjugate rocks on Navarino Island in Tierra del Fuego.

The driving mechanism behind the formation of the arc, as proposed by Alvarez 1982, is a mantle return-flow from the Pacific to the Atlantic.
