= Scotia plate =

Minor oceanic tectonic plate between the Antarctic and South American plates

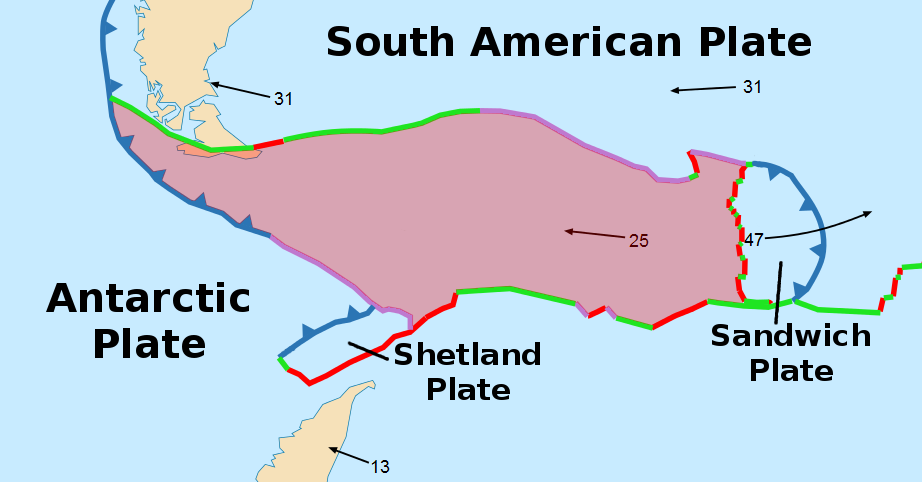
- Type: Minor
- Approximate area: 1,651,000 km^{2} (637,000 sq mi)
- Movement^{1}: West
- Speed^{1}: 25mm/year
- Features: Drake Passage, Scotia Sea, and South Georgia
- ^{1}Relative to the African plate

The Scotia plate (Spanish: Placa Scotia) is a minor tectonic plate on the edge of the South Atlantic and Southern oceans. Thought to have formed during the late Eocene with the opening of the Drake Passage that separates Antarctica and South America, it is a minor plate whose movement is largely controlled by the two major plates that surround it: the Antarctic plate and the South American plate. The Scotia plate takes its name from the steam yacht Scotia of the Scottish National Antarctic Expedition (1902–04), the expedition that made the first bathymetric study of the region.

Roughly rhomboid, extending between 50°S 70°W and 63°S 20°W, the plate is 800 km (500 mi) wide and 3,000 km (1,900 mi) long. It is moving WSW at 2.2 cm (0.87 in)/year and the South Sandwich plate is moving east at 5.5 cm (2.2 in)/year in an absolute reference frame. Its boundaries are defined by the East Scotia Ridge, the North Scotia Ridge, the South Scotia Ridge, and the Shackleton fracture zone.

The Scotia plate is made of oceanic crust and continental fragments now distributed around the Scotia Sea. Before the formation of the plate began 40 million years ago (40Ma), these fragments were at least partly exposed above the water, and formed a continuous landmass from Patagonia to the Antarctic Peninsula along an active subduction margin. It served as one end of the Antarctic land bridge, a wider land bridge that connected South America, Antarctica, and Australia. At present, the plate is almost completely submerged, with only the small exceptions of South Georgia on its northeastern edge and the southern tip of South America.

== Tectonic setting ==
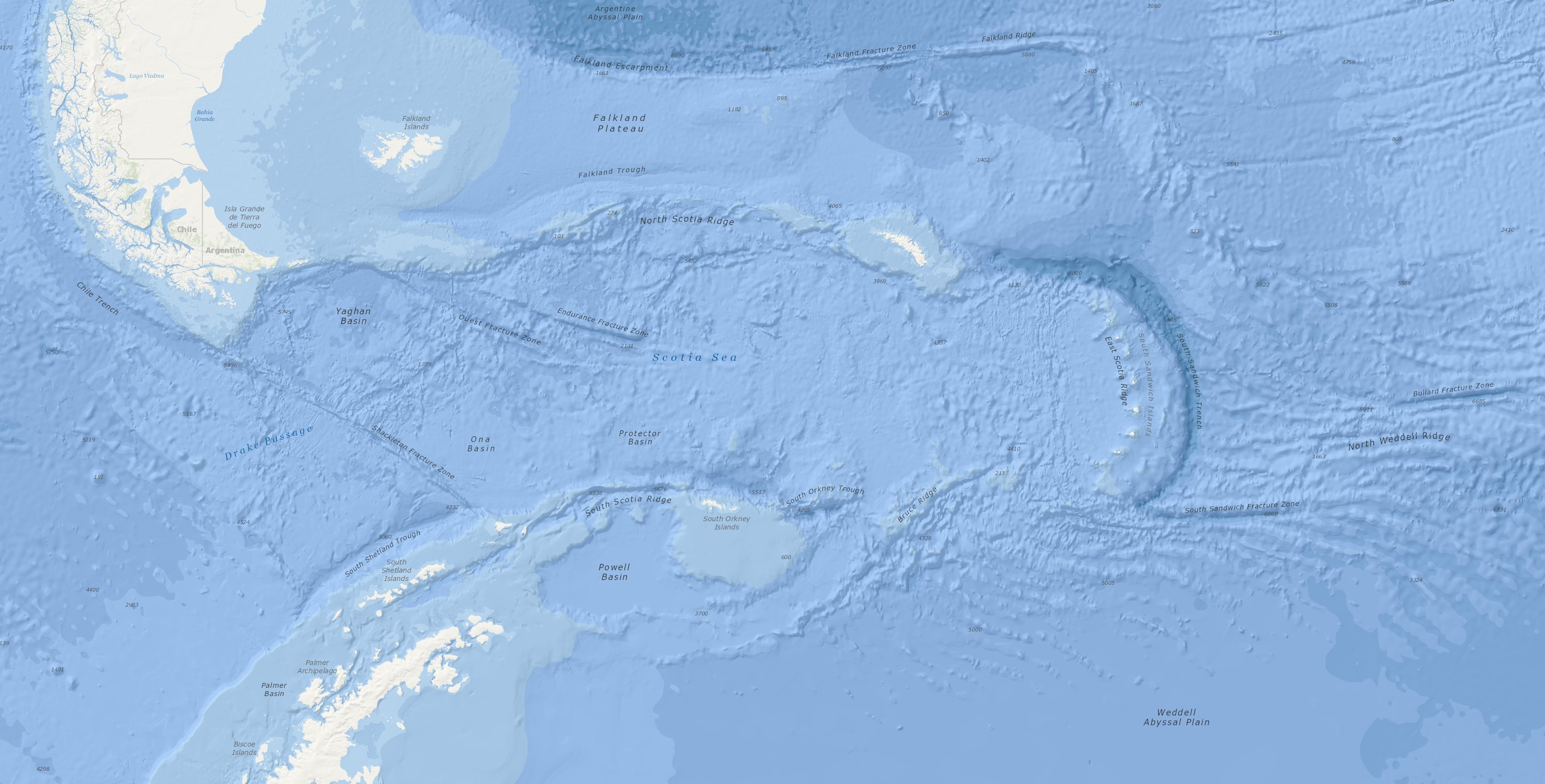
Bathymetric map of Scotia plate

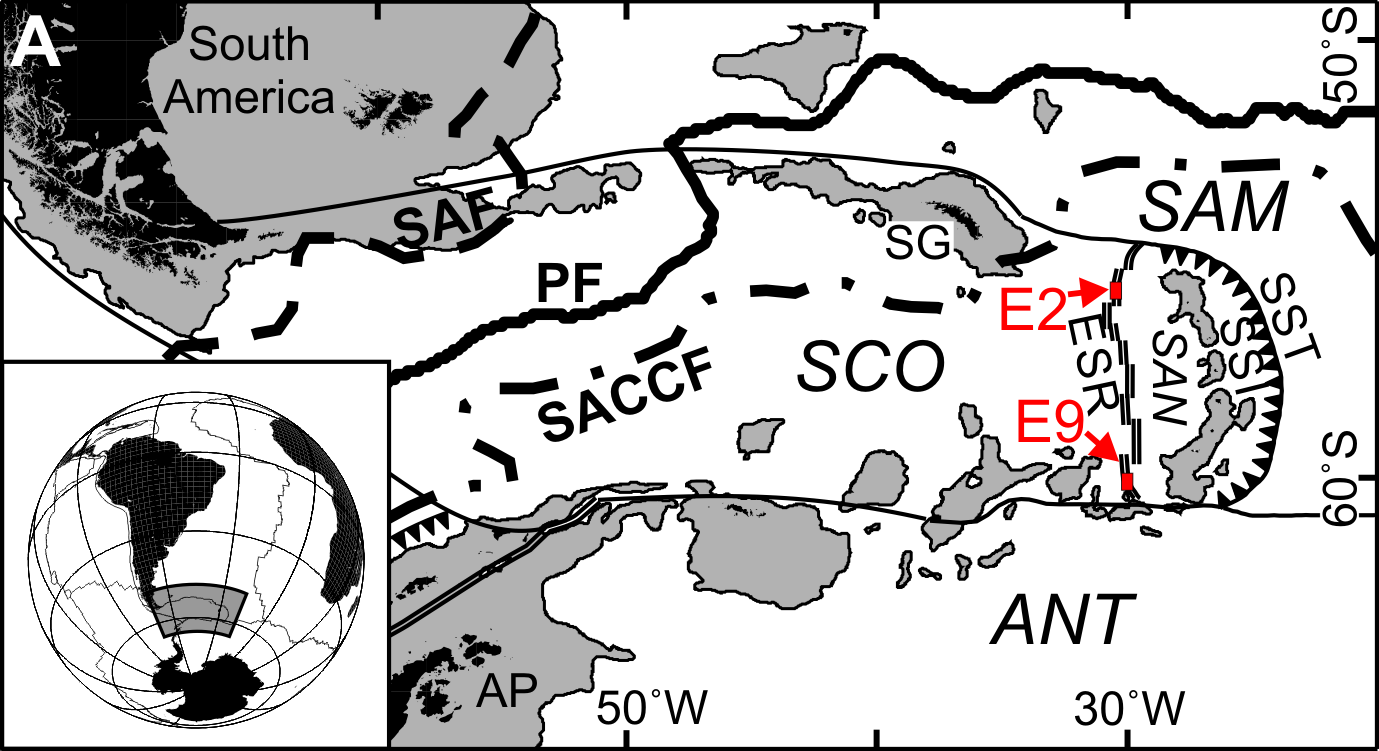
The Scotia plate (SCO) bounded by the Antarctic plate (ANT), the South Sandwich plate (SAN), the South American plate (SAM), and the Shetland plate, seen just above the Antarctic Peninsula (AP).

Together with the South Sandwich plate, the Scotia plate joins the southernmost Andes to the Antarctic Peninsula, just like the Caribbean plate joins the northernmost Andes to North America, and these two plates are comparable in several ways. Both have volcanic arcs at their eastern ends, the South Sandwich Islands on the Sandwich Plate and the Lesser Antilles on the Caribbean plate, and both plates also had a major impact on global climate when they closed the two major gateways between the Pacific and Atlantic Oceans during the Mesozoic and Cenozoic.

=== North Scotia Ridge ===
The northern edge of the Scotia plate is bounded by the South American plate, forming the North Scotia Ridge. The North Scotia ridge is a left-lateral, or sinistral, transform boundary with a transform rate of roughly 7.1 mm/yr. The Magallanes–Fagnano Fault is passing through Tierra del Fuego.

The northern ridge stretches from Isla de los Estados off Tierra del Fuego in the west to the microcontinent South Georgia in the east, with a series of shallow banks in between: Burdwood, Davis, Barker, and Shag Rocks. North of the ridge is the 3 km (1.9 mi) deep Falkland Trough.

==== South Georgia microcontinent ====
Experts in plate tectonics have been unable to determine whether the South Georgian Islands are part of the Scotia plate or have been recently accreted to the South American plate. Surface expressions of the plate boundary are found north of the islands suggesting a long-term presence of the transform fault there. Yet seismic studies have identified strain and thrusting south of the islands indicating the possible shift of the transform fault to an area south of the island. It has also been suggested that the plate bearing the islands may have broken off from the Scotia plate, forming a new independent South Georgia microplate, yet there is little evidence to make this conclusion.

The South Georgia microcontinent was originally connected to the Roca Verdes back-arc basin (southernmost Tierra del Fuego) until the Eocene. Before that, this basin went through a series of geological transformations during the Cretaceous, through which South Georgia was first buried, then made a topographic feature again by the Late Cretaceous. At about 45 Ma, South Georgia, still part of the South American plate, got buried again and something, possibly rotation of the Fuegian Andes, completed the break-up and allowed South Georgia a second exhumation. During the Oligocene (34–23 Ma) South Georgia was reburied again as seafloor spreading took place in the West Scotia Sea. 10 Ma, finally, the South Georgia microcontinent was uplifted as a result of the collision with the Northeast Georgia Rise.

=== South Scotia Ridge ===
The southern edge of the plate is bordered by the Antarctic plate, forming the South Scotia Ridge, a left-lateral transform boundary sliding at a rate of roughly 7.4–9.5 mm/yr that occupies the southern half of the Antarctic-Scotia plate boundary. The relative motion between the Scotia plate and the Antarctic plate on the western boundary is 7.5–8.7 mm/yr. Though the South Scotia Ridge is overall a transform fault, small sections of the ridge are spreading to make up for the somewhat jagged shape of the boundary.

At the eastern tip of the Antarctic Peninsula, the beginning of South Scotia Ridge, a small and heavily dissected bank degenerates into several outcrops dominated by Paleozoic and Cretaceous rocks. A small basin, Powell Basin, separates this cluster from the South Orkney microcontinent composed of Triassic and younger rocks.

The eastern continuation of the ridge, the Scotia Arc east of the South Sandwich plate, are the South Sandwich island arc and trench. This volcanic active island arc has submerged ancestors in Jane and Discovery banks in the southern ridge.

=== Shackleton fracture zone ===
The western edge of the plate is bounded by the Antarctic plate, forming the Shackleton fracture zone and the southern Chile Trench. The Southern Chile Trench is a southern extension of the subduction of the Antarctic and Nazca plates below South America. Heading south along the ridge, the subduction rate decreases until its remaining oblique motion evolves into the Shackleton fracture zone transform boundary. The south-western edge of the plate is bounded by the Shetland microplate separating the Shackleton fracture zone and the South Scotia Ridge.

North of South Shetland Islands and along the southern half of the Shackleton fracture zone is the remnant of the Phoenix plate (also known as Drake or Aluk Plate). Around 47 Ma the subduction of the Phoenix plate started as the propagation of the Pacific-Antarctic Ridge continued. The last collision between Phoenix ridge segments and the subduction zone was 6.5 Ma and at 3.3 Ma movements had stopped and the remnants of the Phoenix plate was incorporated into the Antarctic plate. The southern part of the Shackleton fracture zone is the former eastern edge of the Phoenix plate.

=== East Scotia Ridge ===
The eastern edge of the Scotia plate is a spreading ridge bounded by the South Sandwich microplate, forming the East Scotia Ridge. The East Scotia Ridge is a back-arc spreading ridge that formed due to subduction of the South American plate below the South Sandwich plate along the South Sandwich Island arc. Exact spreading rates are still being disputed in the literature, but it has been agreed that rates range between 60 and 90 mm/yr.

The banks of northern Central Scotia Sea are superposed on oceanic basement and the spreading centre of the West Scotia Sea. Analyses of samples of volcaniclastic rocks from these sites indicate they are constructs of a continental arc and in some cases oceanic arc similar to those being formed in the currently active South Sandwich Arc. The oldest volcanic arc activity in the central and eastern regions of the Scotia Sea are 28.5 Ma. The South Sandwich forarc originated in the Central Scotia Sea at that time but has since been translated eastward by the back-arc spreading centre of the East Scotia Ridge.

=== West Scotia Ridge ===
One of the most prominent features in the Scotia plate itself is the median valley known as the West Scotia Ridge. It was produced by two plates that are no longer independently active: the Magallanes and Central Scotia plates so is an extinct spreading center. The ridge consists of seven segments separated by right-lateral transform faults of various lengths. The western region of the Scotia plate can be dated to 26–5.5 Ma suggesting spreading was active before spreading completely translated to the East Scotia Ridge at about 6 Ma. It was assumed that spreading cessation occurred where the W7 segment joins the North Scotia Ridge. However basalt lava sampled from the eastern side of the W7 segment were found to be between 93 and 137 million years old and the geochemistry of arc-like basalts suggests no sea floor spreading actually occurred in the W7 segment itself. This has resulted in the suggestion that the W7 segment is a downfaulted block of the North Scotia Ridge of the Fuegian Andes continental margin arc, or is potentially related to the putative Cretaceous Central Scotia Sea.

== Timeline ==
The timing of the formation of the Scotia plate and opening of the Drake Passage have long been the subject of much debate due to the important implications for changes in ocean currents and shifts in paleoclimate. The thermal isolation of Antarctica, engendering the formation of the Antarctic ice sheet, has largely been attributed to the opening of the Drake Passage.

=== Formation ===
The Scotia plate originated about 80 million years ago (Ma), during the late Mesozoic at the Panthalassic margins of the Gondwana supercontinent between two Precambrian cratons, the Kalahari and East Antarctic Cratons, now located in Africa and Antarctica. Its development was also influenced by the Río de la Plata Craton in South America. The initial cause for its formation was the break-up of Gondwana in what became the south-west Indian Ocean.

The earliest marine fossils found on the Maurice Ewing Bank, on the eastern end of the Falkland Plateau, are associated with the Indian and Tethys Oceans and probably slightly more than 150 Ma. The Weddell Sea opened and spread along the southern margin of the Falkland Plateau and into the Rocas Verdes back-arc basin which extends from South Georgia and along the Patagonian Andes. Fragments of the inverted oceanic basement of this basin are preserved as ophiolitic complexes in this area, including the Larsen Harbour complex on South Georgia. This makes it possible to restore the original position of the South Georgia microcontinent south of the Burdwood Bank on the western North Scotia Ridge south of the Falkland Islands.

The Rocas Verdes basin was filled with turbidites derived from the volcanic arc on its Pacific margin and partly from its continental margin. The Weddell Sea continued to expand which led to the extension between the Patagonian Andes and the Antarctic Peninsula. In the Mid-Cretaceous (100 Ma) the spreading rate in South Atlantic increased significantly and the Mid-Atlantic Ridge grew from 1200 km to 7000 km. This led to compressional deformations along the western margin of the South American plate and the obduction of the Rocas Verdes basement onto this margin. Structures associated with this obduction are found from Tierra del Fuego to South Georgia. The acceleration of the westward motion of South America and the inversion of the Rocas Verde Basin finally lead to the initiation of the Scotia Arc. This inversion had a strike-slip component which can be seen in the Cooper Bay dislocation on South Georgia. This geological regime lead to the uplift and elongation of the Andes and the embryonic North Scotia Ridge, which resulted in the initial eastward relocation of the South Georgia microcontinent and formation of the Central Scotia Sea.

=== Opening of Drake Passage ===
Between the Late Cretaceous and the Early Oligocene (90–30 Ma) little changed in the region, except for the subduction of the Phoenix plate along the Shackleton fracture zone. The Late Paleocene and Early Eocene (60–50 Ma) saw the formation of South Scotia Sea and South Scotia Ridge — the first sign of separation of the southern Andes and the Antarctic Peninsula — which resulted in seafloor spreading in the West Scotia Sea and hence the initial opening of a deep Drake Passage. The ongoing lengthening of the North Scotia Ridge beyond the Burdwood Bank caused South Georgia to move further east. The banks of the North Scotia Ridge contain volcanic rocks similar to those found in Tierra del Fuego, including on Isla de los Estados on the easternmost tip.

During the early Eocene (50 Ma), the Drake Passage between the southern tip of South America at Cape Horn and the South Shetland Islands of Antarctica was a small opening with limited circulation. A change in relative motion between the South American plate and the Antarctic plate would have severe effects, causing seafloor spreading and the formation of the Scotia plate. Marine geophysical data indicates that motion between the South American plate and the Antarctic plate shifted from N–S to WNW–ESE accompanied by an eightfold increase in the separation rate. This shift in spreading initiated crustal thinning and by 30–34 Ma, the West Scotia Ridge formed.

A complex pattern of spreading prior to 26 Ma is probably present in the oldest parts of this spreading regime; i.e. west of Terror Rise (north of Elephant Island) and on the shelf slope of Tierra del Fuego. Until 17 Ma the Central Scotia plate moved quickly eastwards, fuelled by the eastern trench migration, but both plates have moved very slowly since.
