= South Sandwich Trench =

Deep trench in the South Atlantic Ocean

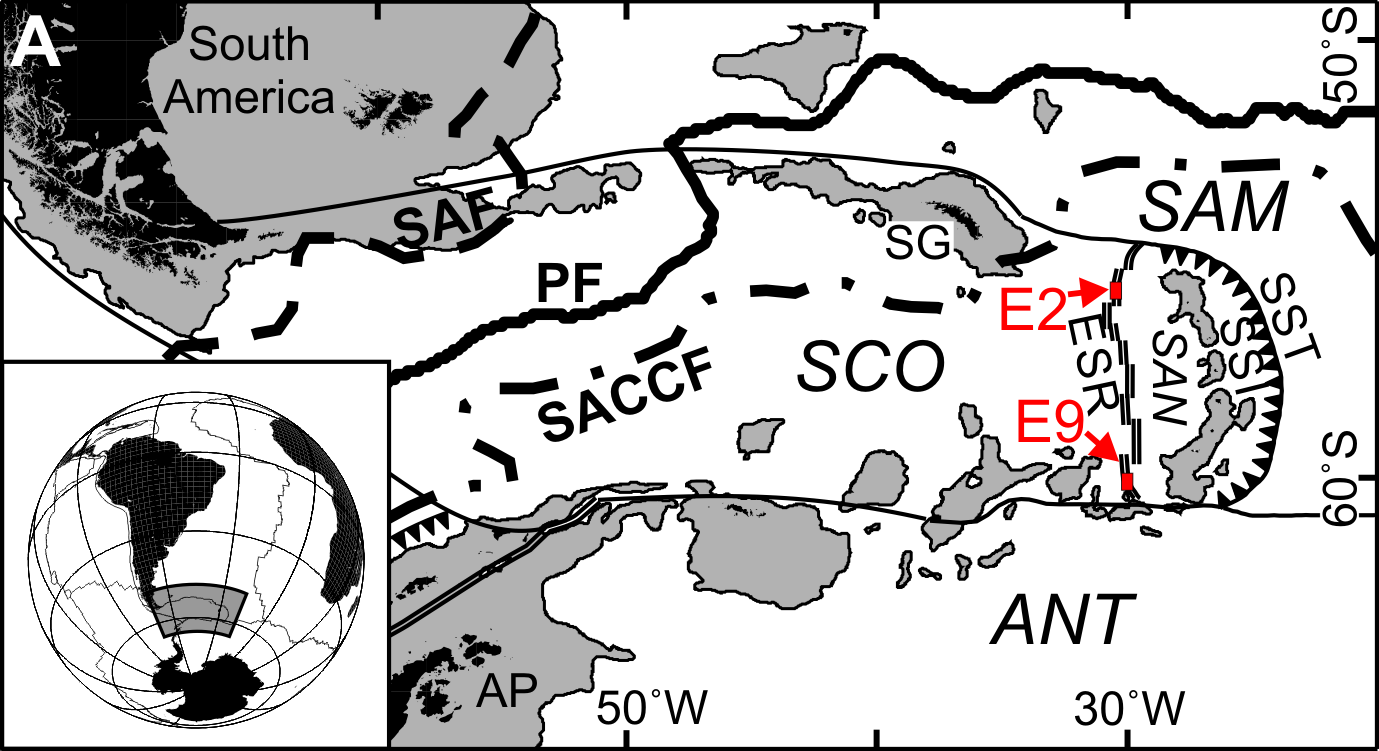
Map of the South Sandwich plate (SAN) shows its position between the Antarctic plate (ANT), the Scotia plate (SCO), and the South American plate (SAM). The East Scotia Ridge (ESR), the South Sandwich Islands (SSI), and the South Sandwich Trench (SST) are also visible.

The South Sandwich Trench is a deep arcuate trench in the South Atlantic Ocean lying 100 kilometres (62 mi) to the east of the South Sandwich Islands. It is the deepest trench of the Southern Atlantic Ocean, and the second-deepest of the Atlantic Ocean after the Puerto Rico Trench. Since the trench extends south of the 60th parallel south, it also contains the deepest point in the Southern Ocean.

The deepest point in the entire trench is the Meteor Deep, whose location prior to February 2019 was identified as 55°25.12′S 26°24.28′W at a depth of 8,202 metres (26,909 ft). This sounding was made during the German Meteor expedition. The depth is named after the German survey ship Meteor, which first surveyed the area as part of its namesake expedition in 1926. The deepest point below the 60th parallel south, the deepest point in the Southern Ocean, is dubbed by Victor Vescovo as the Factorian Deep, a name that he hopes will become official. This point lies at a depth of 7,433.6 metres (24,388 ft), and is the only subzero Hadal zone in the world.

The trench is 965 kilometres (600 mi) long and has a maximum depth of 8,266 metres (27,119 ft) below sea level at 55°13.47′S 26°10.23′W, as measured by a Kongsberg EM124 multibeam sonar from February 2–7, 2019 during the Five Deeps Expedition. This measurement was made during the first complete sonar mapping of the trench which covered its entire length, with a measurement error of +/- 11 metres (36 ft). The deepest point of the South Sandwich Trench is only 110 metres (361 ft) shallower than the deepest point in the Puerto Rico Trench, sometimes known as the Milwaukee or Brownson Deep.

The trench is produced by the subduction of the southernmost portion of the South American plate beneath the small South Sandwich plate. The South Sandwich Islands constitute a volcanic island arc which results from this active subduction. Mount Belinda on Montagu Island is an active volcano.

== Meteor Deep 2019 survey ==
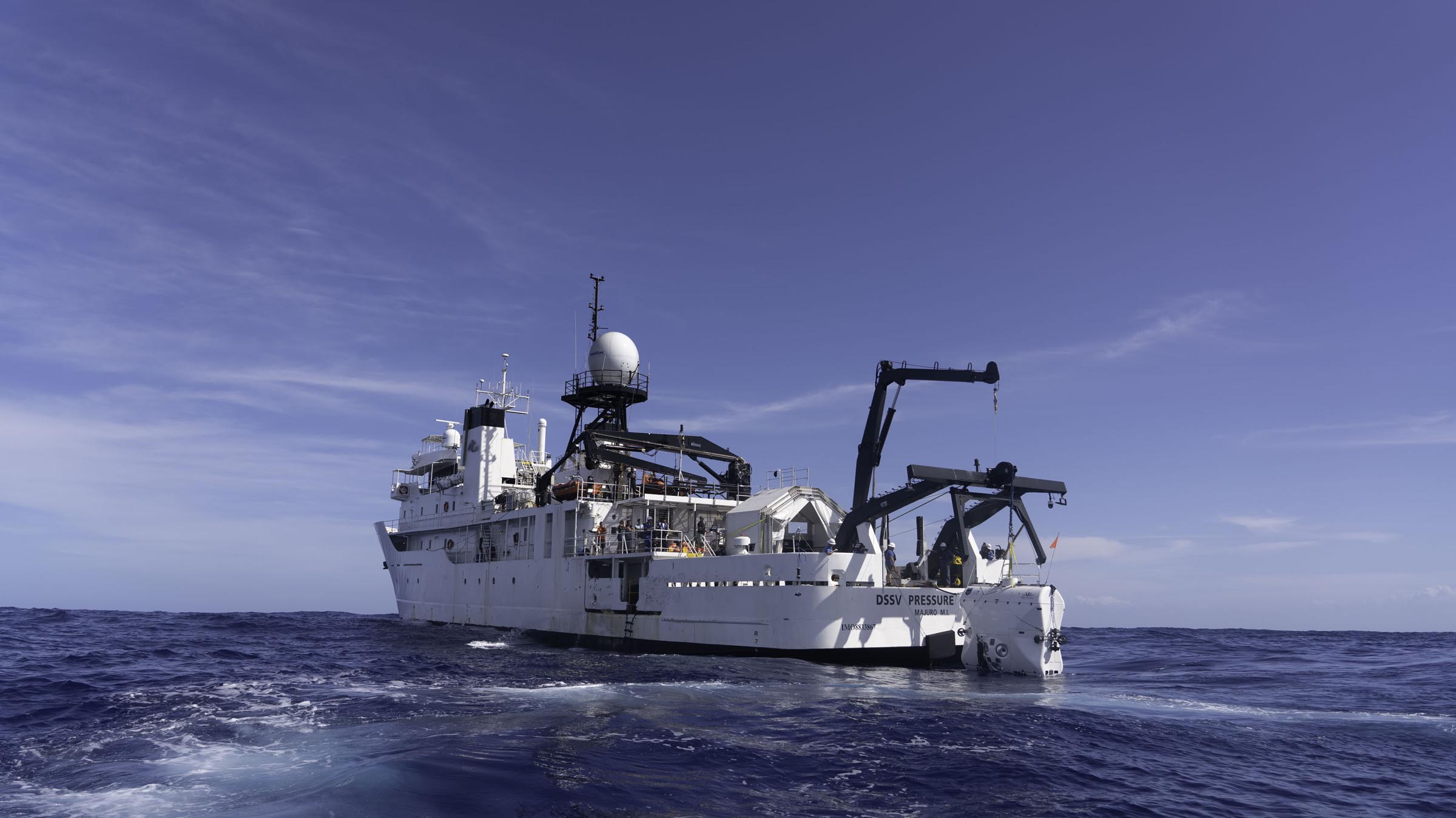
DSSV Pressure Drop and DSV Limiting Factor at its stern

In February 2019, the Five Deeps Expedition, led by its survey ship DSSV Pressure Drop, has recommended that the location of the Meteor Deep be "relocated" to the newly discovered, truly deepest location at 55°13.47′S 26°10.23′W and 8,266 metres (27,119 ft) ± 13 metres (43 ft) in depth, given the precision of the new survey. This new deepest point is part of the same subsurface feature as the previous Meteor Deep location so the expedition recommended keeping the old name.

Pressure Drop completed an entire survey of the trench on February 9, 2019, and made the data publicly available to GEBCO in 2019. Approximately ten other major subsurface features including various deeps, seamounts, and ridges—previously unidentified—were mapped by the vessel and new names for the features were submitted to the International Hydrographic Organization (IHO) in 2019.

== "Factorian Deep" crewed descent ==
The southernmost portion of the South Sandwich Trench reaches south of 60°S latitude and is therefore in the Southern Ocean. The maximum depth of that ocean is also in the South Sandwich Trench, which was surveyed by the Five Deeps Expedition in early February 2019. The expedition's sonar team identified the deepest point at 60°28.46′S 025°32.32′W, with a depth of 7,434 metres (24,390 ft) ± 13 metres (43 ft). The expedition leader and chief submersible pilot Victor Vescovo has proposed naming this deepest point in the Southern Ocean the "Factorian Deep," based on the name of the crewed submersible DSV Limiting Factor, in which he successfully visited the bottom for the first time on February 4, 2019. The deepest points of a maritime trench have historically been named after the vessel that first discovered or explored them.

== See also ==
- Antarctica
- Scotia Sea
