= Scotia Sea =

Sea in the Southern Ocean

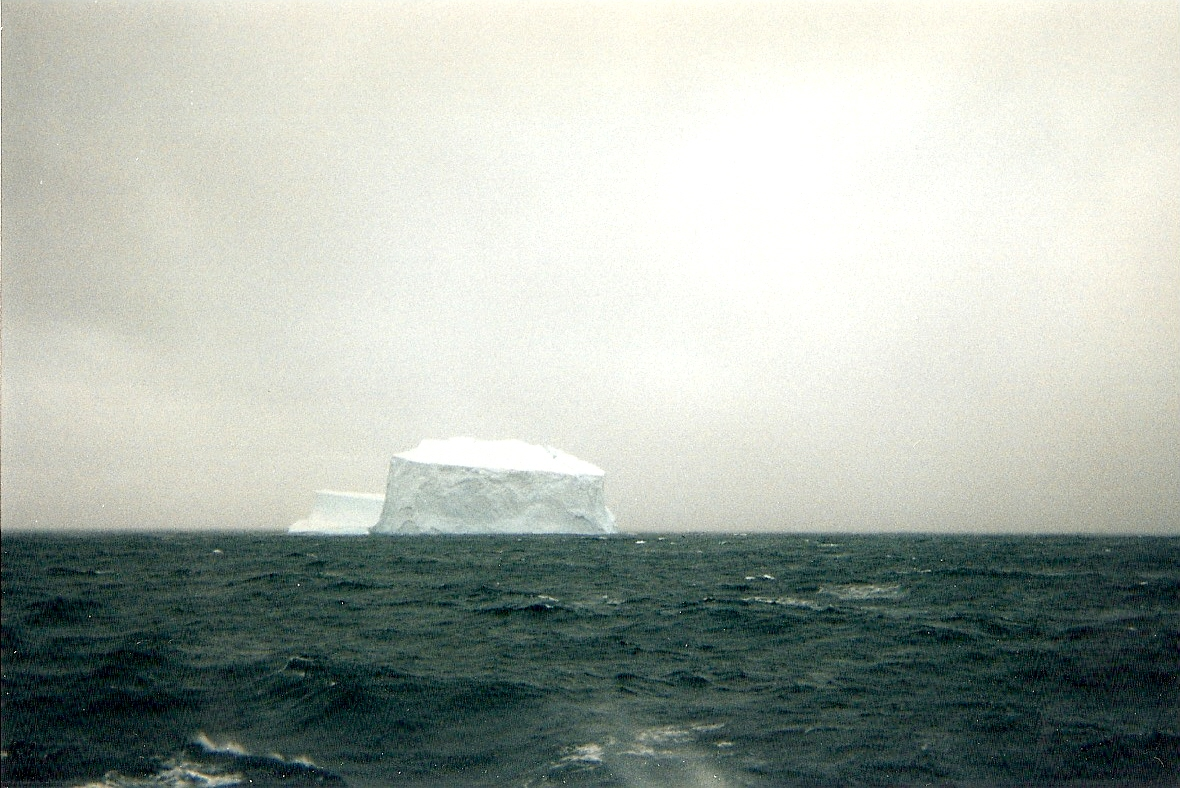
- Tabular iceberg in the Scotia Sea, 1996

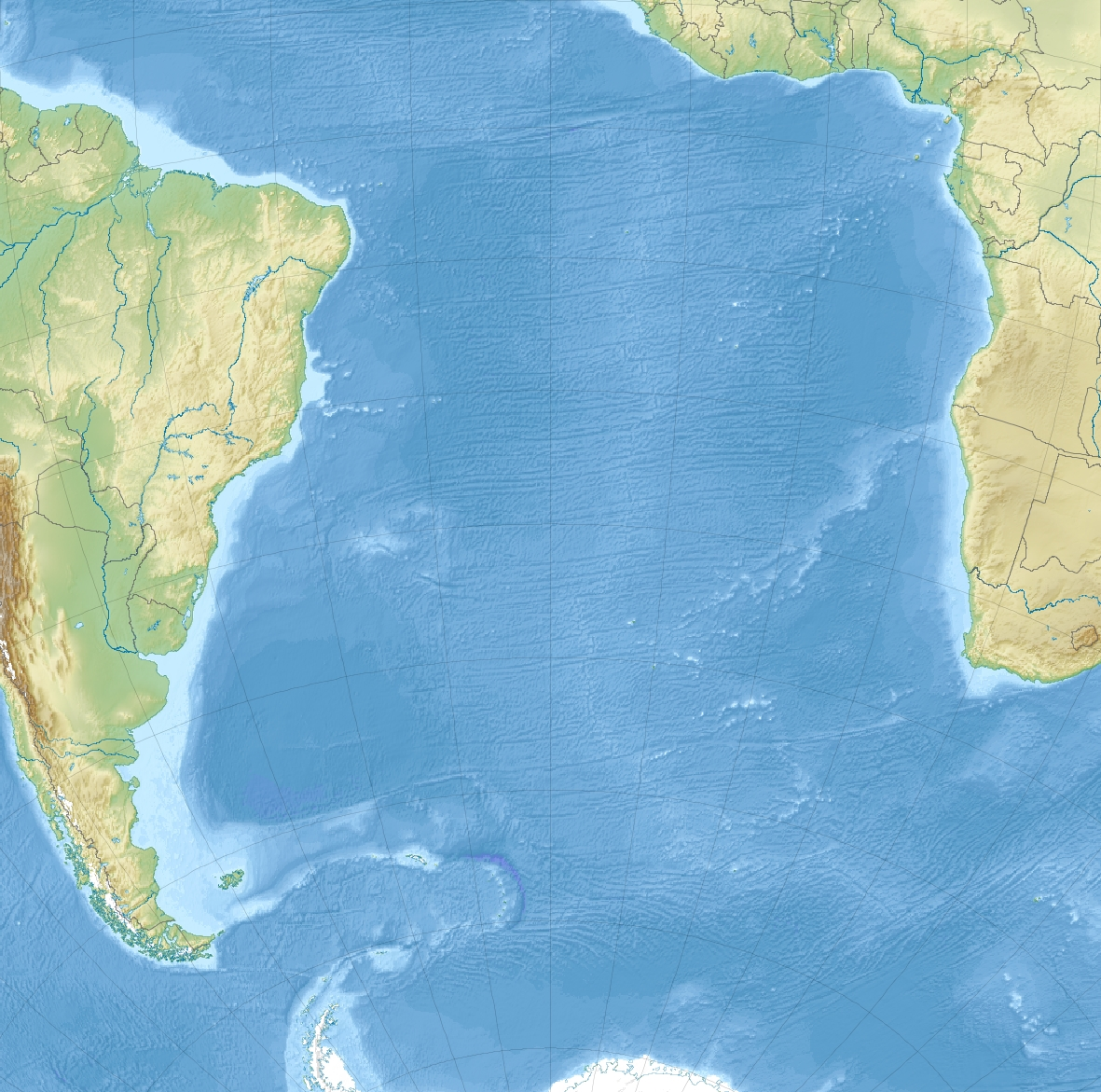
- Location of the Scotia Sea

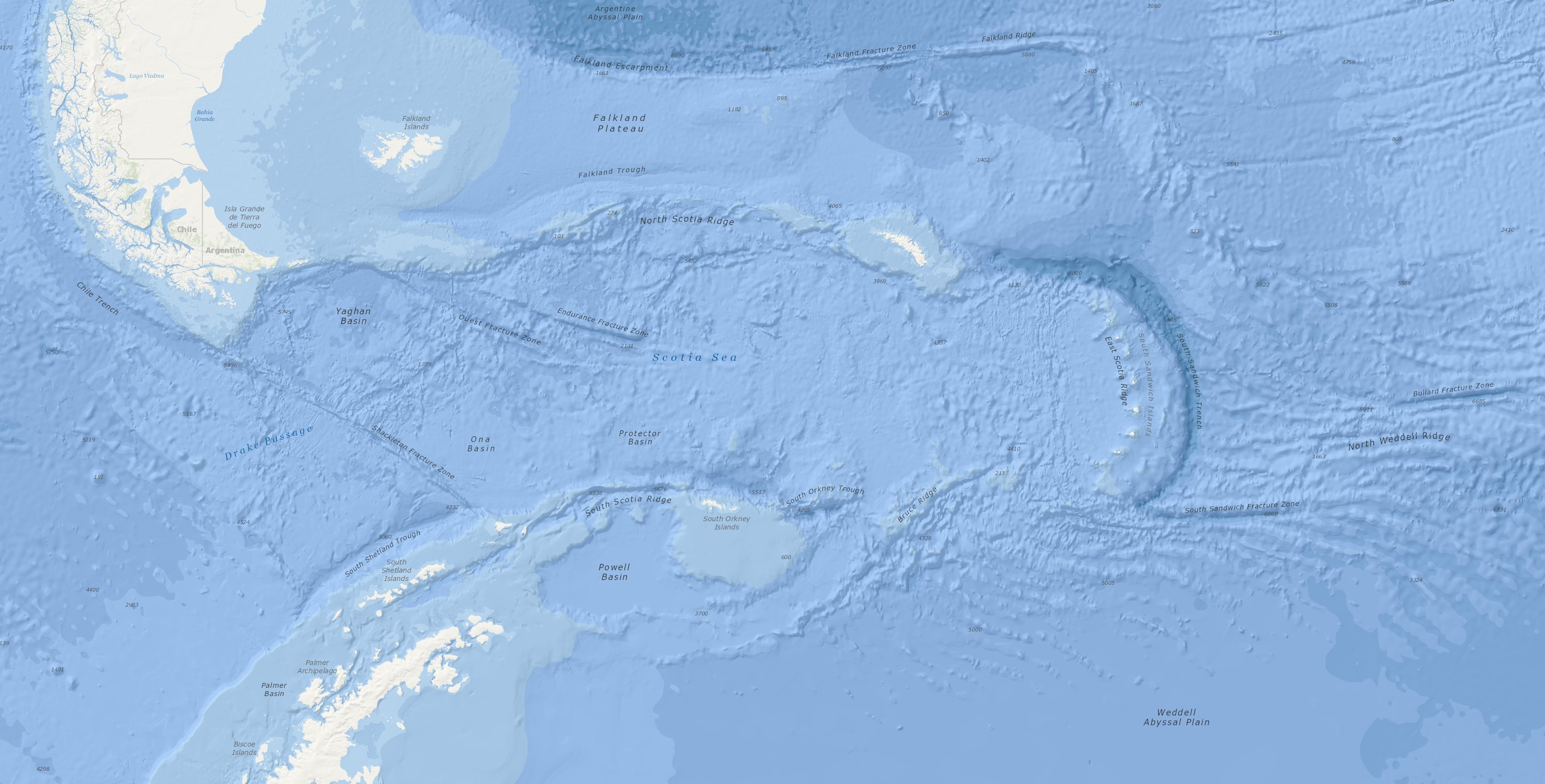
- Bathymetric map of the Scotia Sea
- Coordinates: 57°30′S 40°00′W
- Type: Sea
- Ocean/sea sources: Southern Ocean
- Surface area: 900,000 km^{2} (347,500 sq mi)
- Max. depth: 6,022 m (19,757 ft)

The Scotia Sea is a sea located at the northern edge of the Southern Ocean at its boundary with the South Atlantic Ocean. It is bounded on the west by the Drake Passage and on the north, east, and south by the Scotia Arc, an undersea ridge and island arc system supporting various islands. The sea sits atop the Scotia plate. It is named after the expedition ship Scotia. Many icebergs melt there.

== Location and description ==
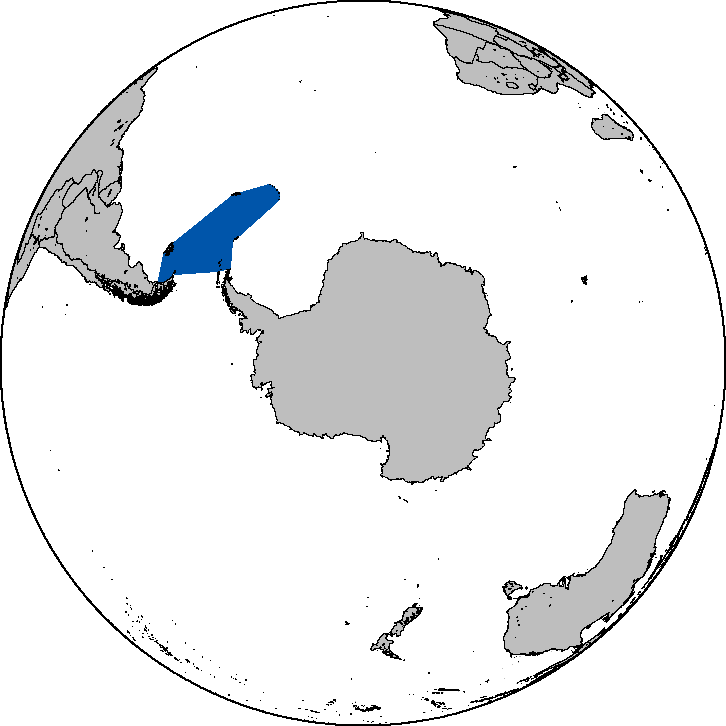
Approximate area of the Scotia Sea in the Southern Hemisphere

The Scotia Sea is the area of water between the Drake Passage, Tierra del Fuego, South Georgia, the South Sandwich Islands, the South Orkney Islands, and the Antarctic Peninsula. These island groups all sit atop the Scotia Arc, which frames the sea on the north, east, and south. The Scotia Sea covers an area around 900,000 km^{2} (347,500 sq mi). About half of the sea stands above the continental shelf.

== History ==
The sea was named about 1932 after the Scotia, the expedition ship used in these waters by the Scottish National Antarctic Expedition (1902–1904) under William S. Bruce. The most famous traverse of this frigid sea was made near the end of the Imperial Trans-Antarctic Expedition in 1916 by Sir Ernest Shackleton and five others in the adapted lifeboat James Caird. They left Elephant Island, just off the tip of the Antarctic Peninsula, and reached South Georgia Island two weeks later. It was a distance of nearly 900 miles and the sun was only sighted for navigational fixes four times during the entire journey.

In Argentina, the Scotia Sea is considered part of an area known as the Mar Argentino, and several territories claimed but not occupied by Argentina, such as South Georgia and the Falkland Islands, lie within this region.

== Flora and fauna ==
The islands bordering the Scotia Sea are rocky and partly covered in ice and snow year round. Despite these harsh conditions, however, the islands do support vegetation. They have been described as the Scotia Sea Islands tundra ecoregion, which includes South Georgia, the volcanic South Sandwich Islands, and the South Orkneys in the Scotia Sea, as well as the remote South Shetland Islands near the Antarctic Peninsula and the small isolated volcano called Bouvet Island. All these islands lie in the cold seas below the Antarctic Convergence. These areas support tundra vegetation consisting of mosses, lichens, and algae, while seabirds, penguins, and seals feed in the surrounding waters.

Seabirds include four main species of albatross: black-browed albatross (Thalassarche melanophris), grey-headed albatross (Thalassarche chrysostoma), light-mantled albatross (Phoebetria palpebrata), and snowy albatross (Diomedea exulans). Only five species of land birds remain on the islands, and these include an endemic race of the yellow-billed pintail duck (Anas georgica) and the endemic South Georgia pipit (Anthus antarcticus). Other birds include the southern giant petrel, with sizeable colonies on Bird Island.

Penguin species found here include large numbers of king penguins on South Georgia especially, as well as chinstrap penguin, macaroni penguin, gentoo penguin, Adelie penguin, and rockhopper penguin (Eudyptes chrysocome).

Seals include the Antarctic fur seal (Arctocephalus gazella) and sub-Antarctic fur seal (Arctocephalus tropicalis) in large numbers, leopard seal (Hydrurga leptonyx), Weddell seal (Leptonychotes weddellii), the huge southern elephant seal (Mirounga leonina), and crabeater seal (Lobodon carcinophagus).

== Threats and preservation ==
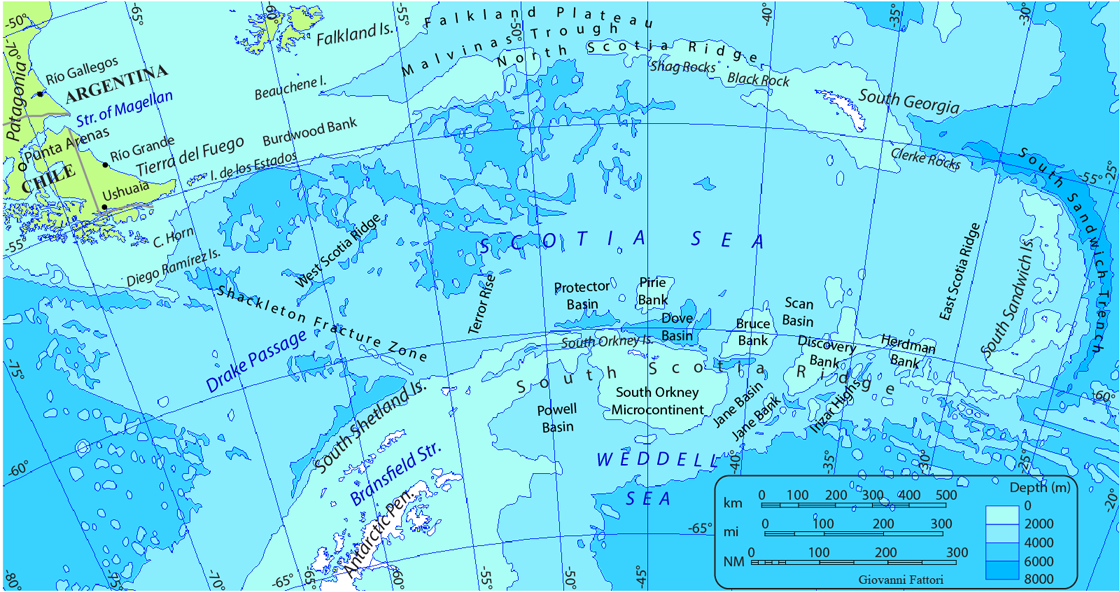
Map of the Scotia Sea. Toponyms: Undersea relief, maritime, nearby lands, countries and cities. Isobath interval: 2000 m

Although the Scotia Arc islands have a harsh climate and have never been permanently occupied, they have long been used as a base for fishing and seal hunting. Wildlife on these remote islands is threatened by introduced species, especially on South Georgia, where even large animals, including (now removed) reindeer, have been brought to the islands. Further damage to ecosystems results from overfishing. South Georgia, the South Sandwich Islands, and Bouvet Island are protected as nature reserves, with Bird Island, South Georgia, being a site of special scientific interest. The seals are further protected by international agreements, and fur seal populations are recovering.

== See also ==
- East Scotia Basin
- West Scotia Basin
