= South Sandwich plate =

Small tectonic plate south of the South American plate

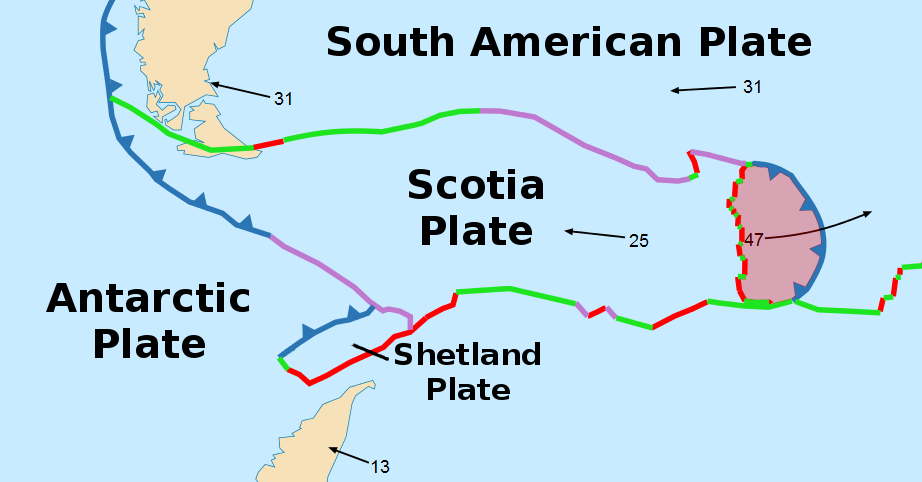
- Type: Micro
- Approximate area: 170,000 km^{2} (66,000 sq mi)
- Movement^{1}: East
- Speed^{1}: 47mm/year
- Features: South Sandwich Islands, Southern Ocean
- ^{1}Relative to the African plate

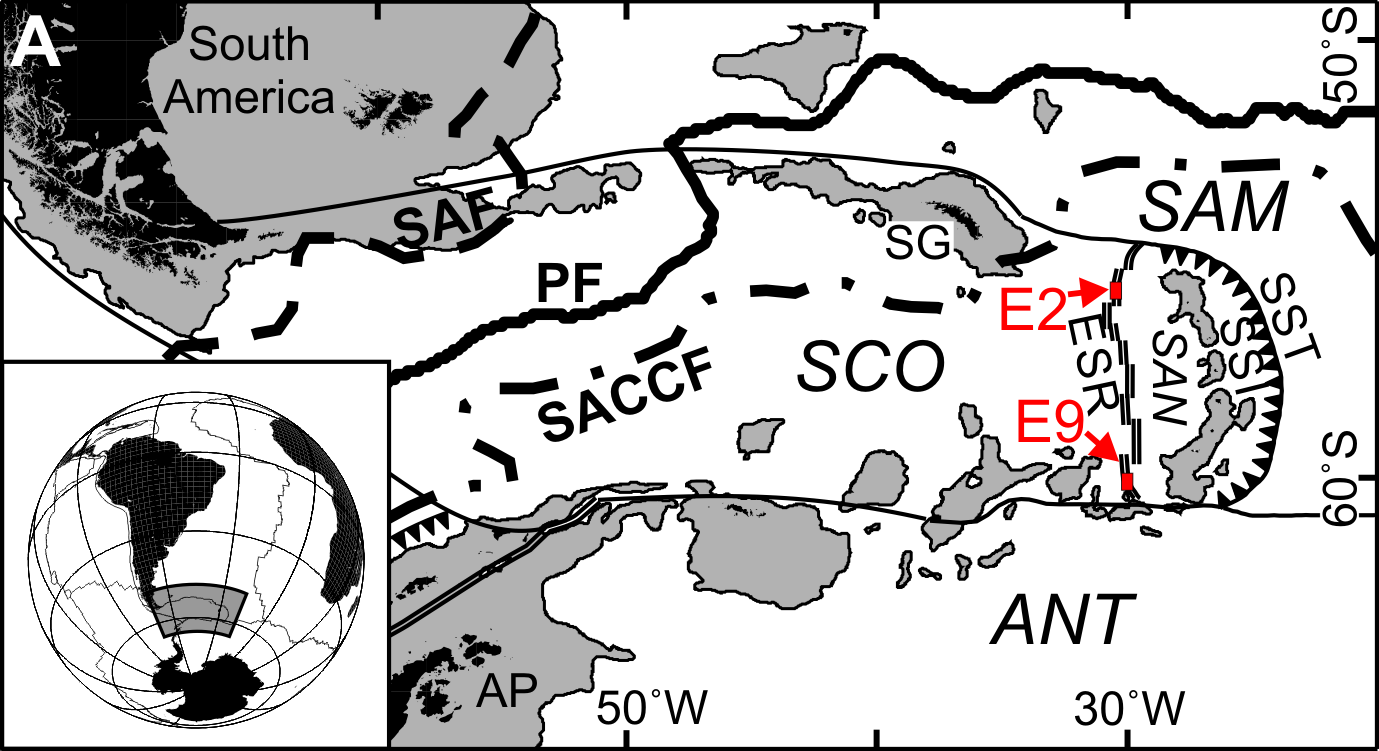
Map of the South Sandwich plate (SAN) shows its position between the Antarctic plate (ANT), the Scotia plate (SCO), and the South American plate (SAM). The East Scotia Ridge (ESR), the South Sandwich Islands (SSI), and the South Sandwich Trench (SST) are also visible.

The South Sandwich plate or the Sandwich plate (not to be confused with a culinary sandwich plate) is a small tectonic plate (microplate) bounded by the subducting South American plate to the east, the Antarctic plate to the south, and the Scotia plate to the west. The plate is separated from the Scotia plate by the East Scotia Rise, a back-arc spreading ridge formed by the subduction zone on its eastern margin. The South Sandwich Islands are located on this microplate.

The initiation of the South Sandwich subduction zone, a convergent plate margin, began around 66 million years ago in response to regional convergence of the Antarctic and South American tectonic plates. Gradual extension of the Scotia Sea and subduction roll back of South American oceanic lithosphere created the ancestral Scotia plate. The South Sandwich Microplate separated from the Scotia plate around 15 million years ago as a back arc basin formed with development of the East Scotia Rise. There is continued debate over the reason for the separation of the South Sandwich plate from the Scotia plate. Two primary mechanisms have been proposed, subducting slab roll back and absolute motion of the Scotia plate away from the trench. A combination of these two mechanisms could also contribute to the current plate boundary configurations.

== Citations ==
- Kurt Stüwe: Geodynamics of the Lithosphere: An Introduction Springer; 2nd edition (2007) p390 ISBN 978-3-540-71236-7
