= List of ships named Aurora =

Many vessels have been named Aurora, generally for the Roman goddess of the dawn:

== Mercantile ==
- Aurora (1779 ship) was launched at Philadelphia in 1779. She did not appear in British registers until 1800. She then made four complete voyages as a slave ship in the triangular trade in enslaved people. On her fifth voyage she sustained damage. She was condemned at Jamaica in 1807 after having landed the enslaved people that she was carrying.
- Aurora (1782 ship) was launched at Kingston upon Hull. She traded with the Baltic until 1803 when she became a Greenland whaler. In 1808 she brought in a record amount of whale oil. She was lost in 1821 on her 18th voyage to the northern whale fishery.
- Aurora (1789 ship) was launched at Whitby. Between 1799 and 1806 she made four voyages as a whaler in the southern whale fishery. She is last listed in 1809 with stale data since her whaling voyages.
- Aurora (1790 ship) was launched at Calcutta; she made two voyages for the British East India Company (EIC) and was lost circa 1822.
- Aurora (1793 ship) was launched at Chester in 1793 as a West Indiaman. During her career first the French and then a United States' privateer captured her, but she returned to British hands. Between 1801 and 1808 she made four voyages as a slave ship. After the end in 1807 of the British slave trade she continued to trade widely until 1831.
- Aurora (1808 ship) was launched at Whitby. She took settlers to South Africa under the British government's 1820 Settlers scheme. She was last listed in 1847.
- Aurora (1816 ship) was launched at Chittagong; she twice transported convicts to Australia and in 1840 brought migrants for the New Zealand Company to Wellington, New Zealand; she was wrecked on 27 April 1840 after having landed her migrants
- Aurora (1874 ship) was launched in Greenock for James Thompson & Co. She was lost in 1875 when her cargo of wool caught fire.
- SY Aurora, an 1876 steam yacht used for Antarctic exploration that made several Antarctic expeditions
- SS Aurora, several steamships
- MV Aurora, several motor ships

== Naval ==
- HCS Aurora (1809) was a sloop-of-war launched at Bombay Dockyard for the Bombay Marine. She was still listed on the rolls of the Bombay Marine on 1 January 1828.
- HMS Aurora — any of several Royal Navy ships
- Aurora, a 1833 Russian Imperial Navy frigate famous its part in Siege of Petropavlovsk
- Aurora, a 1900 Russian Imperial Navy cruiser that was key to the October Revolution
- USS Aurora (SP-345), a United States Navy tugboat and minesweeper

== Other ==
- R/V Aurora, Danish research vessel owned by Aarhus University.
- Aurora (2020 ship), a cable layer
