= South Antilles =

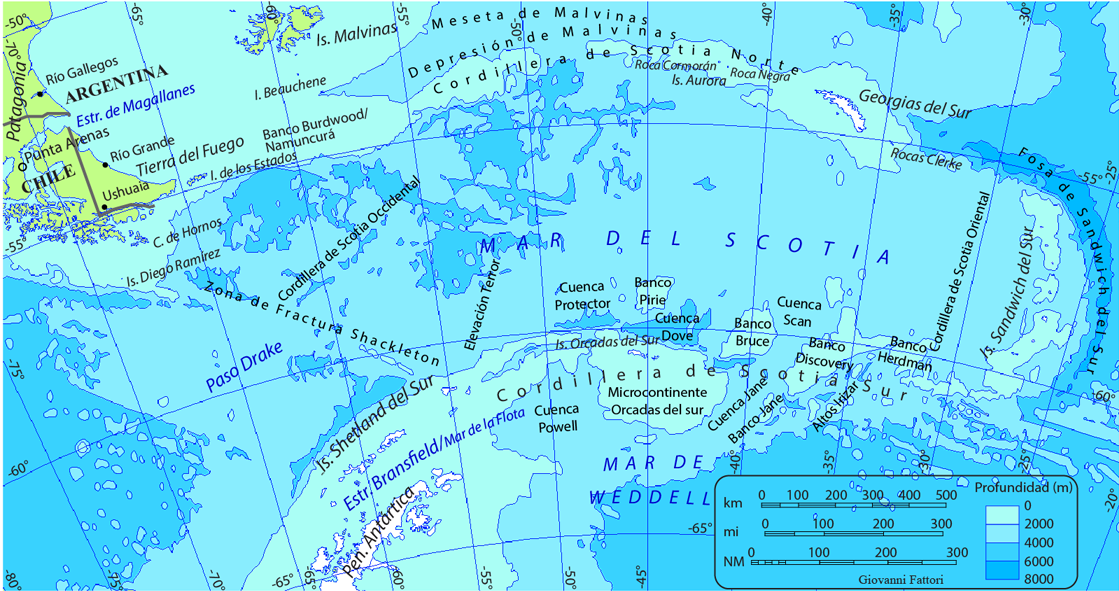
Map of the Scotia Sea and the South Antilles

The South Antilles (in Spanish: Antillas del Sur) or Antartilles (in Spanish: Antartillas) is the name given in some parts of South America to the insular group of volcanic origin that extends in the form of a great sinusoid from the southeastern edges of the Argentine Sea to bordering the western coasts of the Antarctic Peninsula.

The archipelagos that make up the whole of the South Antilles are the emerged areas of the submarine continuation of the Andes mountain range, such undersea continuation is called the Arc of the Austral Antilles or Scotia Arc. Some geographers, particularly Chileans, have postulated the thesis according to which this chain would be the natural division between the Atlantic and Pacific oceans.

Following geodetic and geopolitical criteria, two sectors are usually distinguished. The first of them is made up of the South American South Antilles or the South Atlantic Ocean — geodesically those located north of parallel 60° S—, which are strictly speaking subantarctic islands. The other sector is that of the South Antilles that are south of the aforementioned parallel, this sector is of Antarctic islands, which are under the Antarctic Treaty regime.

Another geographical criterion is the one that places the Antarctic limits in the Antarctic Convergence, if this criterion is used, all the South Antilles are already in the Antarctic area (although the northernmost ones are located on the border between the Antarctic Confluence and the South Atlantic).

From the foregoing it is observed that the South Antilles in their sector north of parallel 60° are part of the group of islands of the South Atlantic. All the South Antilles are claimed by the United Kingdom (as a British Overseas Territory and as part of the British Antarctic Territory) and by Argentina (as part of the Tierra del Fuego province). The islands to the south of that parallel are subject to the Antarctic Treaty and claimed not only by Argentina and the United Kingdom, but also by Chile.

Among the South Antilles, there are South Georgia with the South Sandwich Islands, the South Orkney Islands, the South Shetland Islands, the Palmer Archipelago, the Adelaide Island and the Alexander Island. The archipelago has an extension of 62,209 square kilometres (24,019 sq mi).

== Geography ==
All the South Antilles are mountainous and have coasts with glacial reliefs (fjords abound), in almost all these fjords glaciers currently flow in regression. The whole of the sub-Antarctic South Antilles presents regions cleared of snow during the prolonged summer, in these extensions a vegetal formation of the tundra and tussock types thrives. These islands are almost always covered by ice fields, in the latter the one that stands out the most is the Alexander Island, which is covered by an ice sheet that (on the George VI Sound, called Sarmiento by Argentina) keeps it attached to the Antarctic peninsula, the highest altitude of the South Antilles is precisely in the northeast of the aforementioned Alexander I island in front of Marguerite Bay, on Mount Stephensen, 2,987 metres (9,800 ft).

The volcanism is active in certain segments of this insular link, so near the Melchior Islands is possible, even in the Antarctic winter, swimming in certain areas because they are heated by underwater volcanoes.

== History ==
Gabriel de Castilla and the (mostly) Hispanic expedition members who accompanied him were the first to discover the South Antilles in the middle of the 17th century. Later Hispanic foqueros (mainly from the Southern Cone) used to make stays and camps during the summers, it is in the middle of the s. XVIII that begins the irruption of seamen and whalers of other origins, among them British.

== See also ==
- Scotia Arc
- Scotia Sea
- Scotia Plate
- Antilles
- Natural delimitation between the Pacific and South Atlantic oceans by the Scotia Arc
