= Natural delimitation between the Pacific and South Atlantic oceans by the Scotia Arc =

Hydrographical theory

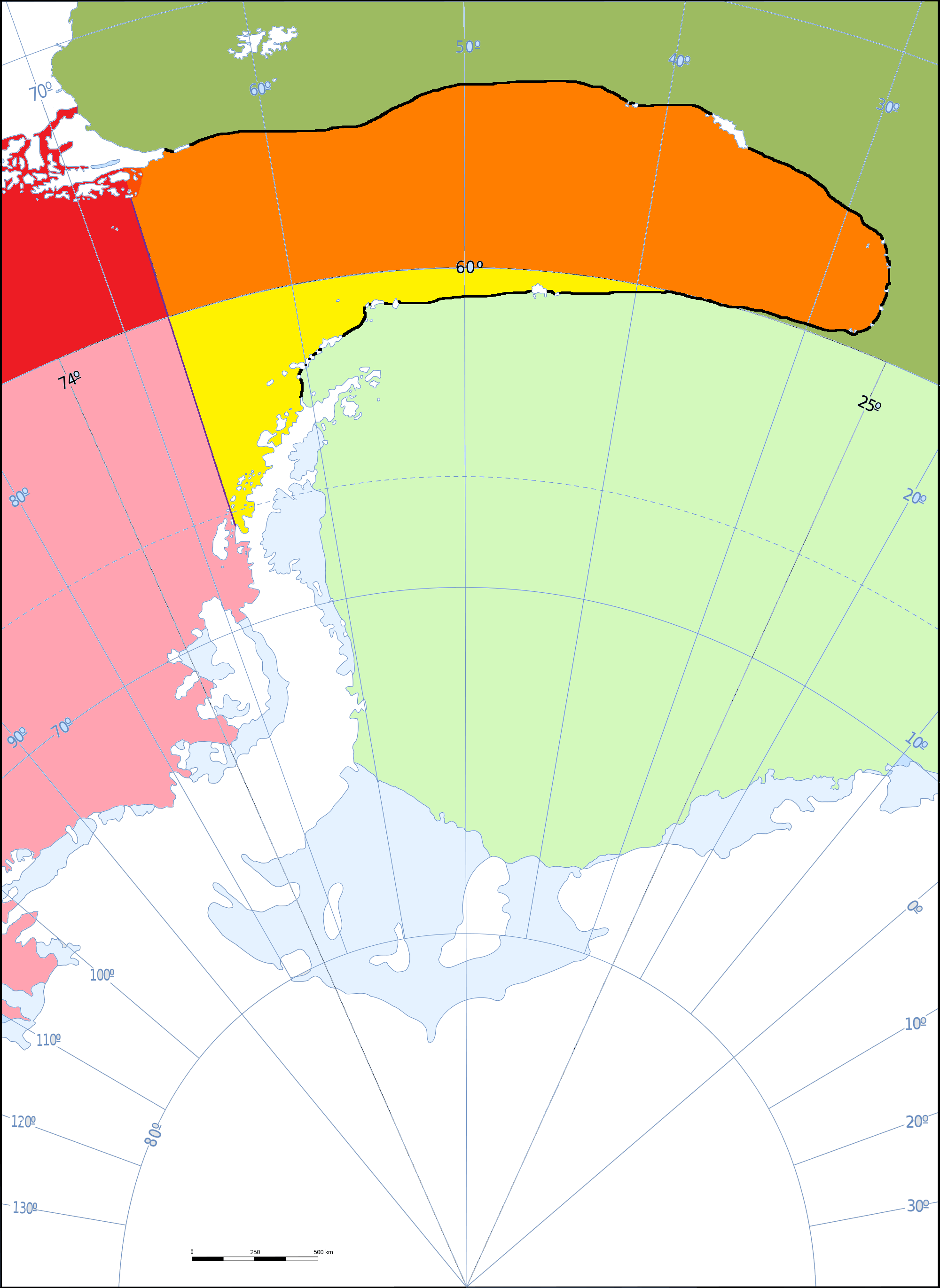
Schematic map showing the proposal presented by the thesis of the natural delimitation between the Pacific and South Atlantic oceans by the Scotia Arc Conventional Pacific Ocean according to the IHO Conventional Pacific Ocean according to the IHO, which become part of the Antarctic Ocean Sector of the conventional Atlantic Ocean (according to the IHO) that would belong to the Pacific according to this theory Sector of the conventional Atlantic Ocean (according to the IHO) that would belong to the Pacific according to this theory, which become part of the Antarctic Ocean Conventional Atlantic Ocean (according to the IHO) Sector of the conventional Atlantic Ocean (according to the IHO) which become part of the Antarctic Ocean

The natural delimitation between the Pacific and South Atlantic Oceans by the Scotia arc (in Spanish: Delimitación natural entre los océanos Pacífico y Atlántico Sur por el arco de las Antillas Australes) is a hydrographical concept developed in Chile in 1952 and defended internationally by Eduardo Saavedra Rojas in which it was postulated that the boundary between the southeast Pacific Ocean and the southwest Atlantic Ocean should not be the meridian of Cape Horn but rather follow the line of the Scotia Arc, an underwater mountain range which links the Tierra del Fuego archipelago with the Antarctic continent.

== Origin ==
The idea was first proposed by the Chilean delegation at the IV conference of the International Hydrographic Bureau (later the International Hydrographic Organization), held in Monte Carlo in 1952, and was formally presented in 1954 to the International Association of Physical Oceanography, gathered at the 10th Assembly of the International Union of Geodesy and Geophysics in Rome. The motion was left to be studied at the 1957 meeting in Buenos Aires but was not carried out. The thesis was presented again in Toronto in 1957.

== Scientific theory ==
The final elaboration of this thesis is in a 1952 work of the Chilean admiral Rafael Santibáñez Escobar. It was based on scientific studies that showed a correlation between the characteristics of the waters of the southeastern Pacific Ocean and those bounded by the Scotia Arc to the east and the Drake Passage to the west, an area known as the Scotia Sea and sometimes also as the Austral Zone Sea (the name that Argentina and Chile agreed to give to the maritime space of undefined limits to the south of the Big Island of Tierra del Fuego, which was the object of delimitation by the Treaty of Peace and Friendship signed by both countries in 1984). Equivalences are presented in all the variables analyzed, showing similar attributes in biological (e.g. flora and marine fauna), geomorphological (e.g. depth, type, and form of substrates), and hydrographic (temperature, color, viscosity, density, and salinity).

Regarding tides, those of the southwestern South Atlantic, such as Río Grande on the Big Island of Tierra del Fuego, are commonly of great tidal amplitude, of the order of 12 to 15 metres (39 to 49 ft) and even more. On the other hand, in the area extending south and southwest from Cape San Diego, tides more closely correspond to the tidal regime of the southeastern South Pacific, which have little amplitude, arriving already from the coast in front of Isla Picton at a difference of not more than 1.5 metres (4.9 ft). This occurs because the Scotia basin is always occupied by waters coming from the Pacific Ocean, because the morphological conformation of the extreme south of South America is inclined towards the southeast while the Antarctic Peninsula is inclined towards the northeast. Both emerged lands form an enormous funnel through which the Antarctic Circumpolar Current flows, which transports the waters of the southeast Pacific to the southwest Atlantic from west to east. In the Drake Passage, a branch of this current breaks off in an east-northeast direction, transporting the waters of the Pacific towards the South Atlantic Current, which is formed from the Atlantic current of Brazil, which flows from the northwest. The waters of the latter join with those originating in the Pacific, outside the Scotia Sea.

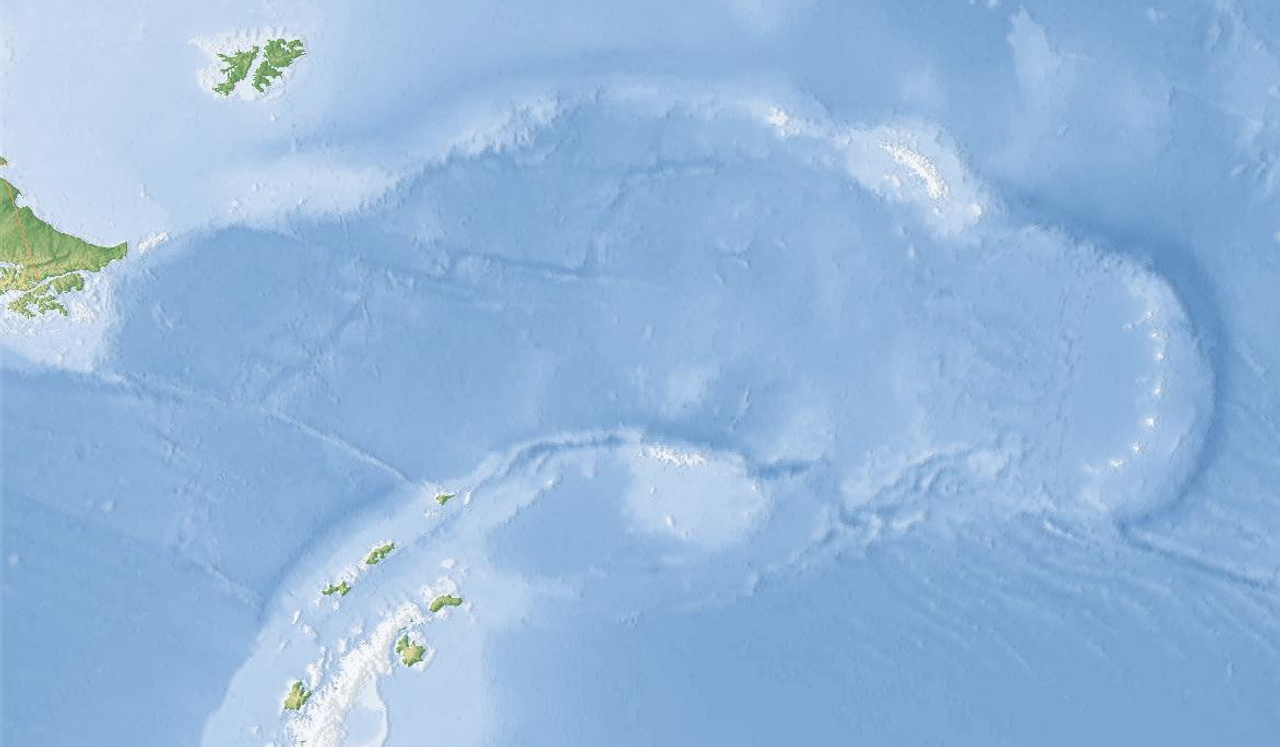
Scotia Arc, the boundary between the Pacific and South Atlantic oceans according to this thesis

Therefore, or so the argument goes, the formal delimitation between the South Pacific and South Atlantic oceans should not be a meridian like that of Cape Horn, but a natural division created by naturally occurring geomorphological features should be applied for their separation, changing the border from one created as a human convention to one delineated by nature itself. This new oceanic geographic limit would be mounted on the Scotia Arc, an oceanic volcanic arc and submarine mountain range that is in essence a sunken continuation of the Andes mountain range and the American Cordillera more generally, connecting to the Antarctic mountain range of the Antarctandes. Geologically it is a young orographic system with strong volcanism and significant seismicity.

The ridge of the Scotia Arc forms a pronounced arc of at least 4,350 kilometres (2,700 mi) in length. It starts at the easternmost peaks of the Isla de los Estados, continues along the Burdwood Bank, and proceeds east to the archipelago called South Antilles or Antartillas that includes the Shag Rocks, South Georgia, the South Sandwich, the South Orkneys and South Shetland, to form the Antarctic Peninsula.

To the east, the boundary is formed by the abyssal South Sandwich Trench, with depths of 8,325 metres (27,313 ft) below sea level. The collision of tectonic plates, such as the South American, Antarctic, and Scotia plate, is what produces the folding of the Earth's crust that originates this ridge.

== Political considerations ==
After this idea was put forward, the Chilean government established its position on it regarding the southern maritime conflicts, especially in the so-called Beagle conflict. Therefore, Chile argued that the coasts of the southern islands Grande de Tierra del Fuego and States were bathed in waters belonging to the Pacific, counteracting Argentina's thesis in the bioceanic principle, which had been proposed as part of a doctrine to determine the maritime boundaries between the two countries in international law.

== The current ocean border ==
For the international community, the conventional limit of both oceans is the meridian of Cape Horn, at least from said Cape to the south, possibly also north of it to the Big Island of Tierra del Fuego.

It is not clear whether the oceanic limit jumps to the small and large islands located there or surrounds them in some way. For some specialists, especially in the past, the section of the Scotia Arc that runs from west to east was considered the dividing line between the Atlantic and Antarctic oceans. The latter is generally circumscribed from the north to more southerly latitudes.

A competing and also scientifically valid boundary between the two oceans was put forward by the researchers Juan Ignacio Ipinza Mayor and Cedomir Marangunic Damianovic, who suggested that separation of the Pacific and Atlantic oceans could be delimited by the Shackleton fracture zone, a natural submarine fault line and mid-ocean ridge, and the tectonic boundary between the Scotia plate and the Antarctic plate, which runs northwest to southeast across the Drake Passage in a roughly straight line from the southern tip of the South American continental shelf to the South Shetland Islands. This places the oceanic boundary line much farther west than the delimitation provided by the Scotia Arc.

== See also ==
- Natural delimitation between the Pacific and South Atlantic oceans by the Shackleton Fracture Zone
- Scotia plate
- South Georgia and the South Sandwich Islands sovereignty dispute
- Borders of the oceans
