= Shag Rocks (South Georgia) =

Group of six South Atlantic islets

Shag Rocks, Aurora Islands
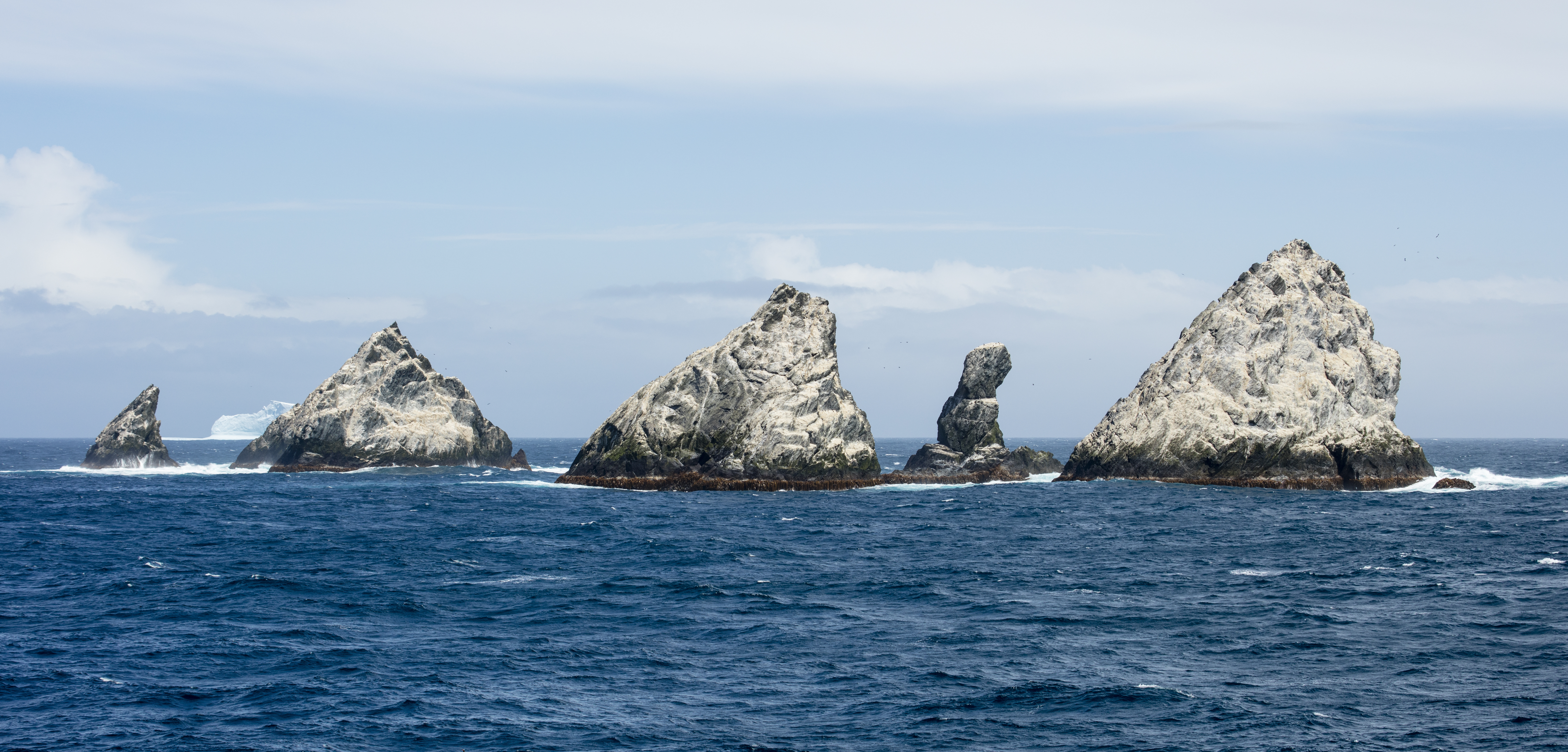
- Interactive map of Shag Rocks, Aurora Islands

Geography
- Coordinates: 53°32′51″S 42°01′12″W
- Archipelago: South Georgia
- Area: 20 ha (49 acres)
- Highest elevation: 75 m (246 ft)

Administration
- United Kingdom

Demographics
- Population: 0

The Shag Rocks (Spanish: Islas Aurora) are six small islets in the westernmost extreme of South Georgia, 240 km (150 mi) west of the main island of South Georgia and 1,000 km (620 mi) off the Falkland Islands. The Shag Rocks are located at 53°32′51″S 42°01′12″W. 16 kilometres (9.9 mi) further southeast is Black Rock, which is located at 53°38′06″S 41°46′30″W.

The Shag Rocks cover a total area of less than 20 hectares (49 acres). Situated on the South Georgia Ridge, they have a peak elevation above sea level of 75 metres (246 ft), and stand in water approximately 319 metres (1,047 ft) deep. Temperatures average −1.2 °C (29.8 °F), rarely climbing above 15 °C (59 °F). There is no significant vegetation, but the rocks are covered by the guano of seabirds. The main wildlife found on the rocks are the South Georgia shags, prions and wandering albatrosses.

== History ==
The Shag Rocks were discovered by Jose de la Llana in 1762 with the Spanish ship Aurora, and originally named the Aurora Islands, after his ship. They were visited by the Spanish ship San Miguel in 1769, again by the Aurora in 1774, and in 1779 by the Spanish ships Princesa and Dolores. In 1794 the Auroras were finally mapped by the Spanish corvette Atrevida. However, the Aurora Islands are considered by many to have been a mistaken sighting that was coincidentally near the Shag Rocks, which were known to sealers prior to 1823. They were later rediscovered by James P. Sheffield and given their current name, probably because shags and other seabirds frequent them. They were charted by Discovery Investigations personnel on the William Scoresby in 1927. The first known landing was made in 1956 when Argentine geologist Mario Giovinetto was lowered from a helicopter to collect rock samples.

== Government ==
The Shag Rocks form part of the British overseas territory of South Georgia and the South Sandwich Islands. Before 1985 they came within the Falkland Islands Dependencies.

Argentina lays claim to the Shag Rocks and Black Rock. Black Rock and Shag Rocks are on the route from the Falkland Islands to South Georgia, on a seamount of Scotia Ridge.

Britain, in 1985, formed its overseas territory of South Georgia and the South Sandwich Islands, which includes Black Rock and Shag Rocks. It now assumes responsibility for preservation and defence of the area.

== See also ==
- Composite Antarctic Gazetteer
- History of South Georgia and the South Sandwich Islands
- List of Antarctic and sub-Antarctic islands
- List of Antarctic islands north of 60° S
- Rockall
