= Black Rock, South Georgia =

Rock in the subantarctic South Atlantic UK territory

Geography
- Coordinates: 53°39′S 41°48′W

Administration
- United Kingdom

Demographics
- Population: Uninhabited

Black Rock (Spanish: Roca Negra) (53°39′S 41°48′W) is a low rock 10 miles (16 km) southeast of Shag Rocks and some 105 miles (169 km) west-northwest of South Georgia. Black Rock may have been considered as part of the "Aurora Islands" reported in this vicinity by the ship Aurora in 1762. It was charted in 1927 by Discovery Investigations personnel on the William Scoresby.

Black Rock and Shag Rocks are on the route from the Falkland Islands to South Georgia Island, on the seamount of Scotia Ridge. Argentina lays claim to Black Rock and Shag Rocks.

== See also ==
- List of Antarctic islands north of 60° S
