= Aurora (1790 ship) =

History

Great Britain
- Name: Aurora
- Namesake: Aurora (mythology)
- Builder: David Robertson & Walter Glass, Calcutta, or Foreman, Hooghli River
- Launched: March 1790, or 1789, or 1791
- Captured: Foundered c.1823

General characteristics
- Tons burthen: 560, or 56085/94, & Brit registry, 573, or 600, or 650 (bm)
- Armament: 6 × 9-pounder guns
- Notes: Teak-built

Aurora was launched in 1790, at Calcutta. The first 10 years of her career are currently obscure. In 1801, she made a voyage to England for the British East India Company (EIC), and then was briefly registered in England. She returned to India to continue to sail as a "country ship" until she was sold to Portuguese or Spanish owners in 1811. She returned to British ownership circa 1816, and made a second voyage for the EIC, this time from China to England. She returned to English registry and made one voyage to India under a license from the EIC. She then switched to sailing between Liverpool and Quebec and was lost in the Atlantic around 1822.

== Career ==
=== First EIC voyage (1800-1801) ===
Aurora was at Calcutta on 17 November 1800. Captain Mungo Gilmore sailed her from Kedgeree on 5 April 1801, bound for England. She was St Augustine's Bay on 22 July, reached St Helena on 19 September, and arrived at Deptford on 24 December. Aurora was admitted to the Registry of Great Britain on 4 February 1802. On 13 March Aurora's agents paid Messrs. David Scott & Co., or Fairlie, Bonham and Co. £2586 3s for her outfitting for her return voyage to India.

Aurora appeared in the Register of Shipping in 1802, with M. "Gremn", master, Fairlie & Co., owners, and trade London–India. Lloyd's Register for 1802 has Aurora's master as M. Gilmore, but lists her owner simply as "India".

Both Lloyd's Register and the Register of Shipping continued to carry their unchanged data for Aurora to the 1809 volume. The Register of Shipping continued to show her master as M. Gremn", and her owner as "Ferley". Aurora had almost certainly returned to Calcutta registry well before 1809, as there is no record of other voyages for the EIC and at the time the EIC was generally not issuing licenses for trade between England and India.

A list published in 1809, of ships belonging to Calcutta lists Aurora, of 650 tons (bm), Andrew Glass, master, and Fairlie, Gilmore & Co., owners.

Aurora, Fairley, Ferguson, and Co., owners, appeared on a list of vessels registered at Calcutta in January 1811. Later that year Aurora was sold to the Spanish, or the Portuguese.

=== 2nd EIC voyage (1817) ===
Captain Thomas Heaviside, in 1817, sailed Aurora from Canton to England. That would suggest that Aurora had returned to Calcutta registry before that. Heaviside had been master of Elphinstone, which a fire at Canton on 12 February 1817, had destroyed. He sailed from Whampoa anchorage on 21 February 1817. Aurora crossed the Second Bar on 25 March, reached St Helena on 6 July, and arrived at Blackwall on 2 September.

In 1813, the EIC lost its monopoly on the trade between England and India. Thereafter, many shipowners sailed their vessels in that trade under a license from the EIC. One report has her being sold in London as a free trader in 1820, but she was already in London and trading with Bengal before that.

Aurora, of 600 tons (bm), reappeared in the 1818 volume of Lloyd's Register with Duncan, master, changing to P. Earl, Bonham & Co., owner, and trade India–Bengal. (Note: Captain Percy Earl had been master of General Hewett on her voyage transporting convicts to New South Wales in 1813-1814.)

On 13 February 1818, Aurora, Earl, master, sailed from Gravesend, bound for Madeira and Madras. On 27 March, she arrived at Madeira, and on 27 April, was at 3°50′N 17°50′W. On 22 June, she arrive at Madras. On 11 August, she sailed for Bengal, where she arrived on 18 August. On 8 December, she arrived at Colombo from Bengal. She had two days earlier struck some rocks near Gindura and lost her false keel. Aurora was carrying the 2nd Battalion Ceylon Volunteers from Bengal to Colombo. On 9 January 1819, she sailed to Bombay to be docked. On 22 April, she arrived at Colombo from Bombay and on 4 May, sailed for Bengal. On 13 May, she arrived at Madras and that same day sailed on for Bengal. On 27 November, she was at the Cape of Good Hope, having come from Bengal and Madras.

On 14 August, Aurora, P. Earl, master, arrived at Quebec from Liverpool. She sailed from Portsmouth on 1 December 1820, bound for London. On 2 December she was at Deal, having come from Quebec.

== Fate ==
By one report Aurora foundered between Canada and England. Aurora last appeared in the Register of Shipping for 1823, with P. Earl, master and owner, and trade Liverpool–Quebec. She last appeared in Lloyd's Register in 1825, with no master, Capt. & Co., owner, and trade London–Quebec. (Note: P. Earl, who appeared as Aurora's master in Lloyd's Register in 1824, appeared in 1825, as master of an Aurora (1816 ship), of 513 tons (bm), built at Chittagong. Percy Earl appeared as master of that Aurora in the East-India register and directory (1824; p. 152).)
