= SS Aurora =

A number of ships have been named Aurora, including:

- SS Aurora (1846)
- SS Aurora (1919)
- SY Aurora

== See also ==
- MV Aurora, a number of motor vessels with this name
