= MV Aurora =

A number of Motor Vessels have been named MV Aurora, including -

- MV Aurora (1920) - an American tanker torpedoed and damaged in 1942
- MV Aurora (1955) - a German cruise ship/ocean liner.
- MV Aurora (1977) - a ferry in the Alaska Marine Highway
- MV Aurora (2000) - a cruise ship operated by P&O Cruises

== See also ==
- SS Aurora - a number of steamships with this name
