= Aurora (1816 ship) =

1816 ship used in travel to Australia

History

United Kingdom
- Name: Aurora
- Namesake: Aurora (mythology)
- Owner: 1819:Cruttenden & Co.; 1824:Allport & Co.; 1824:Captain & Co.
- Builder: James Macrae, Chittagong
- Launched: 6 November 1816 or 1817
- Fate: Wrecked April 1840

General characteristics
- Tons burthen: Originally:513, or 520(bm); Later:550, or 55029/94, (bm)
- Length: 117 ft 0 in (35.7 m)
- Beam: 32 ft 7 in (9.9 m)
- Notes: Teak-built

Aurora was built at Chittagong in 1816. She made one voyage transporting convicts to New South Wales in 1833, and a second transporting convicts to Tasmania in 1835. In 1839 she carried immigrants to New Zealand for the New Zealand Company. She was wrecked in 1840.

== Career ==
In 1819 her master was Captain Robert Dickie. She was virtually rebuilt in 1821. By 1824 her master was Captain Percy Earl, who had also been captain of an earlier Aurora.

Aurora entered Lloyd's Register in 1824, suggesting that she had acquired British registry. P. Earl was listed as master & owner, and her trade was London–Madras.

=== First convict voyage (1833) ===
Captain Dalrymple Dowsen sailed from Portsmouth on 4 July 1833 and arrived at Sydney on 3 November 1833. Aurora had embarked 300 male convicts, and she landed all of them.

Aurora and Lord Lyndoch sailed from Sydney on 8 December. The government had chartered them to carry the 63rd Regiment from Hobart to India.

=== Second convict voyage (1835) ===
Captain James Gilbert sailed from The Downs on 27 June 1835, and arrived at Hobart 7 October 1835. Aurora again carried 300 male convicts, but this time one died on the voyage.

In 1838 Aurora's master and owner was J.A. Cox, and her trade London–Bombay. She also underwent small repairs that year.

=== New Zealand immigrants ===
The New Zealand Company chartered Aurora to carry emigrants from England to New Zealand. Captain Theophilus Heale sailed for New Zealand in 1839. Aurora was among a group of ships carrying settlers that were to rendezvous at Port Hardy on D'Urville Island on 10 January 1840. They left after Oriental. The others in the group were Adelaide, Duke of Roxburgh, and Bengal Merchant, plus a freight vessel, Glenbervie. At the rendezvous they were told of their final destination. Aurora was carrying 148 settlers.

== Fate ==
Aurora was wrecked on 17 April 1840 when she struck a rock while trying to leave Kaipara Harbour. She was carrying a load of kauri spars and the mail from Wellington for England. Her crew were saved and on 9 June arrived at the Bay of Islands by land.

Lloyd's Register for 1840 carries the annotation "LOST" by her name. It gives the name of her master as J.A. Cox.
