= Aurora (2020 ship) =

Aurora is a cable-laying ship owned by Nexans.

The hull was manufactured at the CRIST shipyard in Poland. The hull arrived at Ulstein Verft in June 2020. The ship was launched on 8 November 2020.

The ship is 149.9 metres (492 ft) long.
