= Juan Fernández plate =

Very small tectonic plate in the southern Pacific Ocean

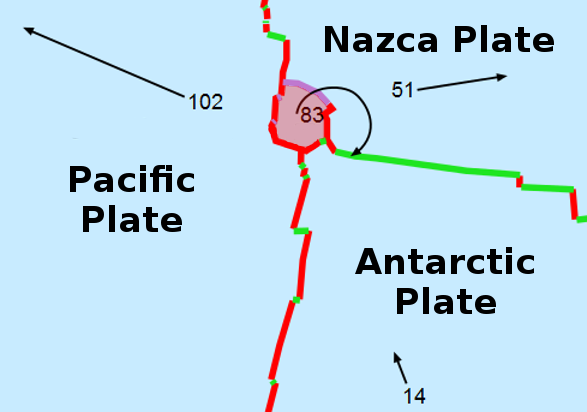
- Type: Micro
- Coordinates: 33.47°S 110.84°W
- Approximate area: 96,000 km^{2} (37,000 sq mi)
- Movement^{1}: Clockwise
- Speed^{1}: 83 mm (3.3 in)/year
- Features: Pacific Ocean
- ^{1}Relative to the African plate

The Juan Fernández plate is a small tectonic plate (microplate) in the Pacific Ocean. With a surface area of approximately 10×10^{5} km^{2} (3.9×10^{5} sq mi), the microplate is located between 32° and 35°S and 109° and 112°W. The plate is located at a triple junction between the Antarctic plate, the Nazca plate, and the Pacific plate. Approximately 2,000 km (1,200 mi) to the west of South America, it is, on average, 3,000 metres (9,800 feet) deep with its shallowest point coming to approximately 1,600 metres (5,200 feet), and its deepest point reaching 4,400 metres (14,400 feet).

== Discovery ==
The Juan Fernández microplate was first discovered in 1972 via seismicity charts, which showed semi-circular patterns at the Pacific-Nazca-Antarctic triple junction. This implied that shear zone was present that were inconsistent with existing plate theories in the area. The microplate, as it is known today, was first mapped and named in 1983, during a Sea Beam survey that specifically mapped the East Pacific Rise between the Easter and Juan Fernández microplates.

After this first sonar mapping of the Juan Fernández microplate, shortly after, the RV Endeavor performed another geological survey defining the boundaries of the plate and identifying the key features of the triple junctions of which the Juan Fernández microplate is the center. Since then, the growth of the plate has been theorized to be influenced by spreading ridges between the Pacific and Juan Fernández plates, accretion onto the plate by the Nazca and Juan Fernández shear zones, and compression of both the northernmost and southeastern points of the Juan Fernández microplate.

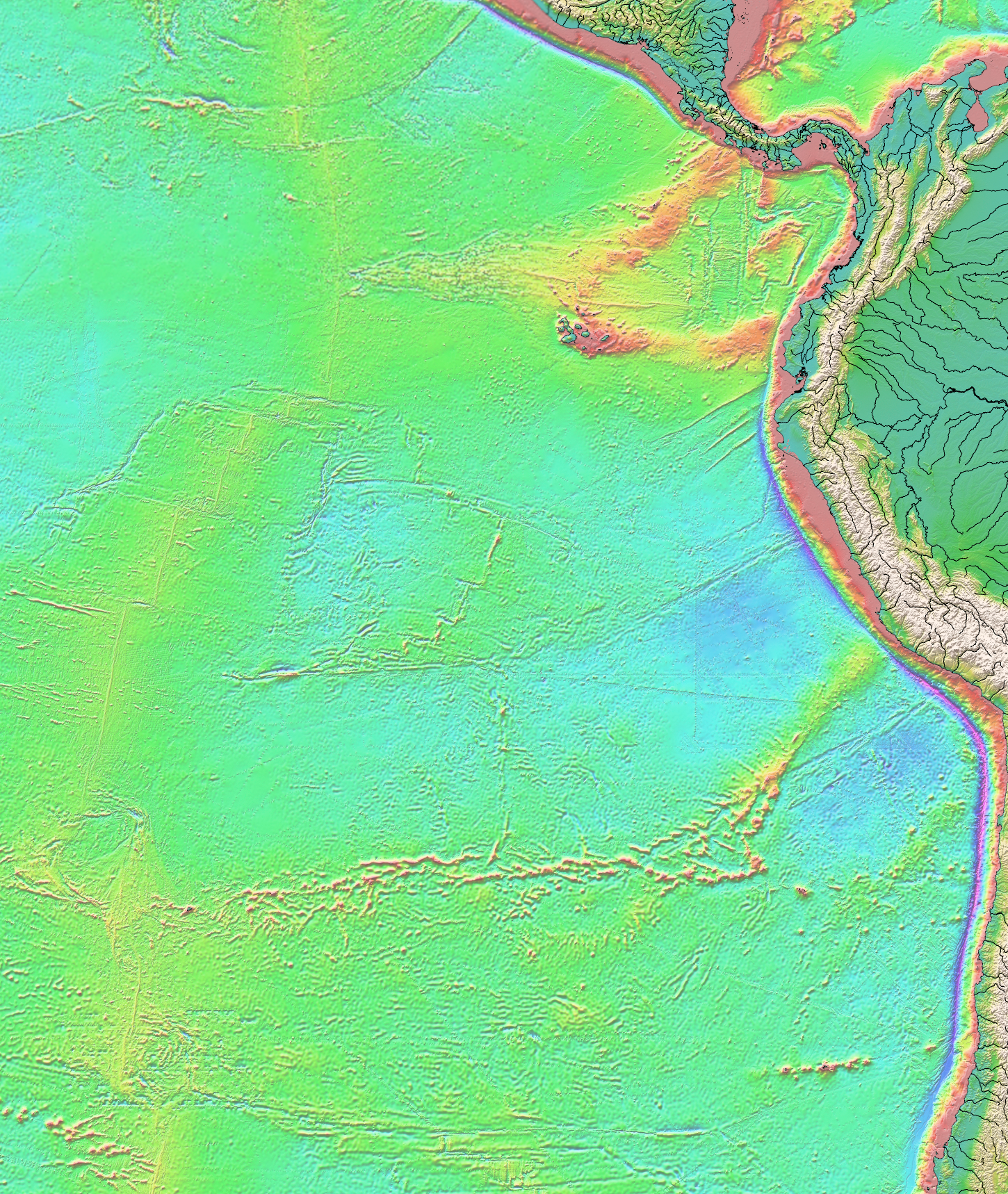
Map showing bathymetric features near Juan Fernández plate.

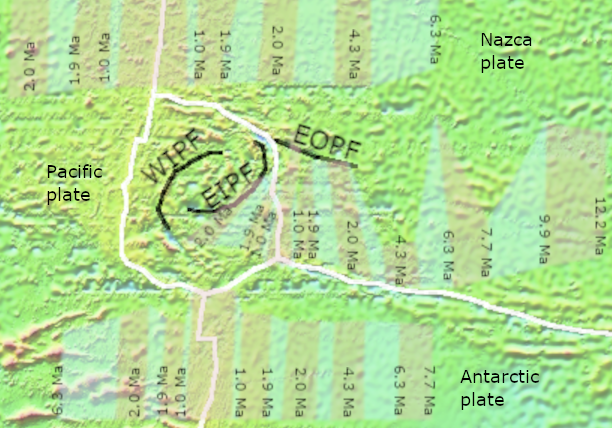
Tectonic features and magnetostratigraphy near the Juan Fernández microplate. The East ridge outer pseudofault (EOPF), West ridge inner pseudofault (EIPF), West ridge inner pseudofault (WIPF) and ages of sea floor spreading in millions of years (Ma) before present are labelled.

== Morphology and geological history ==
This microplate is estimated to have formed approximately 3–4 Ma ago. Once one single spreading center, the East Pacific Rise at this location split in two and resulted in two separate spreading ridges between the Nazca plate and the Pacific plate. The two spreading ridges, along with the Chile Rise, bounded the Juan Fernández microplate. These two spreading centers then accreted material onto the Juan Fernández microplate until it grew into the recognizable shape it is today. As it grew, the northern boundary of the microplate most likely experienced compression due to extreme clockwise rotational force provided by the eastern shear of the Nazca plate and the western shear of the Pacific plate. This area is trends 100° and is quite fractured, from all of thrust, normal and strike-slip tectonics. It contains compressional ridges. To its south have been mapped two regions generated by the rotation forces called respectively the West ridge inner pseudofault and the East ridge inner pseudofault. To the east the fractured area resolves into the East ridge outer pseudofault. As the Nazca plate has a close coupling to the northern boundary of the plate, rotation of the Juan Fernández microplate was at its peak during its beginning stages of formation nearing rotational speeds of 32° per Ma. However, approximately 2.5 Ma ago, the south-eastern tip of the microplate collided against a fracture zone within the Antarctic plate thus causing compression of the microplate against the Antarctic plate and therefore stagnating its rotational motion down to approximately 9° per Ma at approximately 1 Ma ago. The original couplings causing shear then changed from the Pacific-Juan Fernández and Nazca-Juan Fernández boundaries to the Antarctic-Juan Fernández boundary and Nazca-Juan Fernández boundaries. The past 1 Ma has not seen any significant change in plate rotation and growth rate since.

== Rotation ==
Since the earliest surveys of the area, theories about the movement of the Juan Fernández microplate have evolved to include compression of the plate through rotational movement and also shear zones between two major plates and the Juan Fernández microplate driving this clockwise rotational movement. The Pacific plate is estimated to have a spreading rate anywhere between 13 and 16 cm/year (5.1 and 6.3 in/year) in relation to the Juan Fernández microplate. Different sources give slightly different vectors with a recent source having relative to the Nazca plate (which is actually moving towards South America), the north-east portion of the Juan Fernández microplate colliding with the Nazca plate at 5.2 cm/year (2.0 in/year). The Juan Fernández microplate's southern rotational vector is moving north at 10.4 cm/year (4.1 in/year), the Antarctic plate is moving west by 5.7 cm/year (2.2 in/year) and the Pacific plate by 15.1 cm/year (5.9 in/year). This spreading ridge supplies magma to the west of the plate, acting as a lubricant. In the development stages of the microplate, the Pacific plate also shared a coupled shear section to the south of the microplate and, together with the Nazca plate, drove fast rotation of the microplate. Approximately 2.5 Ma ago the Juan Fernández microplate began decoupling from the Pacific plate and coupling with the Antarctic plate. The latter severely braked the rotational movement of the microplate. Presently, the Nazca and Antarctic plates, are the plates that share the current shear zones with transform faulting between them and the Juan Fernández plate. The Nazca plate shears to the east while the Antarctic plate shears relatively to the west, and this continues to drive the rotation of the microplate clockwise as well as consequential compression however at a much slower rate. Compression has been observed on the Juan Fernández microplate at the Pacific-Nazca-Juan Fernández triple junction and the Nazca-Antarctic-Juan Fernández triple junction, due to the slightly irregular shape of the plate which does not rotate perfectly about its center.

== Possible future fates ==
Some researchers claim that as the triple junction that the Juan Fernández microplate shares with the Pacific plate and the Antarctic plate shifts southwest, the plate will continue to have unimpeded clockwise rotational movement for the foreseeable future. Other researchers propose that due to the extent of compression between the Juan Fernández microplate and the Antarctic plate, the microplate will accrete onto the Antarctic plate within the next million years and simply extend the triple junction between the Pacific, Antarctic, and Nazca plate to the current location of the Pacific-Nazca-Juan Fernández triple junction.

=== Tsunami risk ===
The large 9 October 2014 seismic doublet earthquake within the microplate, raised the potential for significant tsunami generation from thrust tectonics that had not been previously recognised. These paired earthquakes had magnitudes of M_{w}7.1 and M_{w} 6.7 and produced at Easter Island 600 km (370 mi; 320 nmi) away a 50 cm (20 in) tsunami.
