= Valdivia fracture zone =

Transform fault zone off the coast of southern Chile

The Valdivia fracture zone (VFZ) is a transform fault zone off the coast of southern Chile which runs between the continental slope near Valdivia in Chile and the Panov Seamount crossing the Chile Ridge.

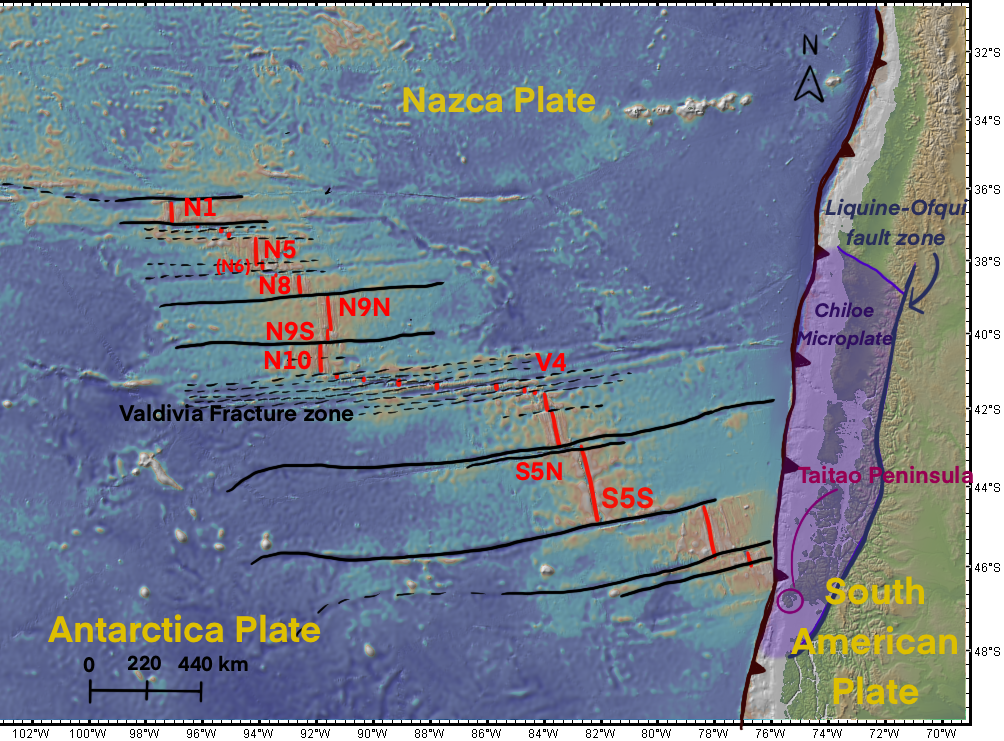
Map of the several segments of Chile Ridge which is divided by numerous transform fault zones, including Valdivia fracture zone. The segment numbers are shown in red words next to the ridge segments. The Chiloé microplate is located at the east of the Chile Ridge and the Liquine-Ofqui fault zone is located between the Chiloé microplate and the main South American plate. Figure made with GeoMapApp (www.geomapapp.org)
