= Chile Ridge =

Submarine oceanic ridge in the Pacific Ocean

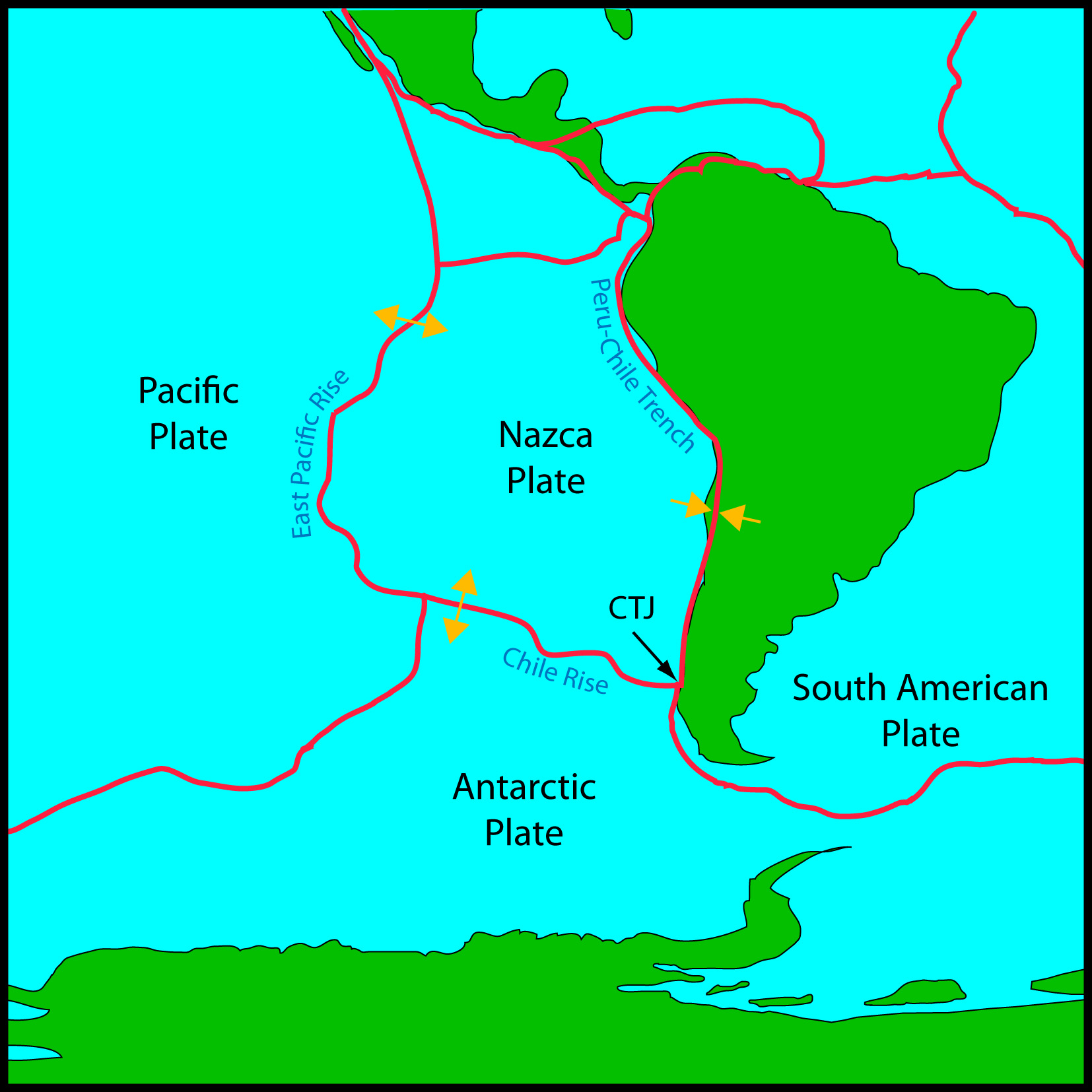
Relationship of the Chile Ridge (Chile Rise) and other plate boundaries (CTJ=Chile triple junction; Yellow arrows show direction of relative motion of plates)

The Chile Ridge, also known as the Chile Rise, is a submarine oceanic ridge formed by the divergent plate boundary between the Nazca plate and the Antarctic plate. It extends from the triple junction of the Nazca, Pacific, and Antarctic plates to the Southern coast of Chile. The Chile Ridge is easy to recognize on the map, as the ridge is divided into several segmented fracture zones which are perpendicular to the ridge segments, showing an orthogonal shape toward the spreading direction. The total length of the ridge segments is about 550–600 km (340–370 mi; 300–320 nmi).

The continuously spreading Chile Ridge collides with the southern South American plate to the east, and the ridge has been subducting underneath the Taitao Peninsula since 14 million years (Ma). The ridge-collision has generated a slab window beneath the overlying South America plate, with smaller volume of upper mantle magma melt, proven by an abrupt low velocity of magma flow rate below the separating Chile ridge. The subduction generates a special type of igneous rocks, represented by the Taitao ophiolites, which is an ultramafic rock composed of olivine and pyroxene, usually found in oceanic plates. In addition, the subduction of the Chile Ridge also creates Taitao granite in Taitao Peninsula which appeared as plutons.

The Chile Ridge involves spreading ridge subduction which is worth studying because it explains how the Archean continental crust initiation formed from deep oceanic crust.

== Regional geology ==
=== Geology of the Chile ridge ===
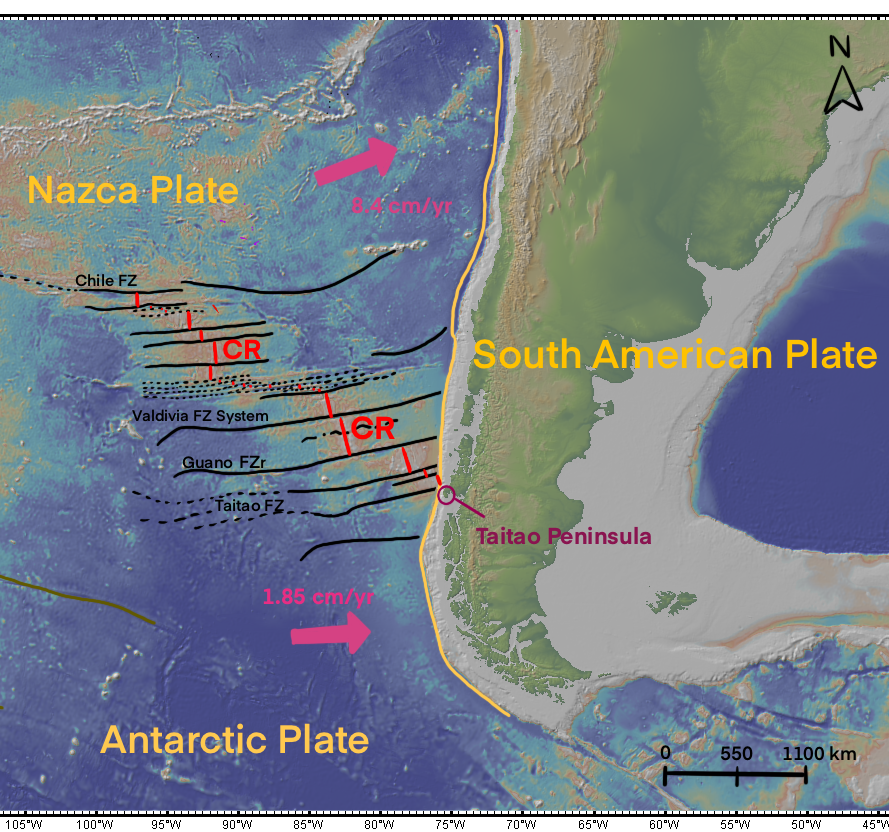
Fig-1 Map of the Chile ridge in the Pacific Ocean. The red line and red letters 'CR' represents Chile ridge. The ridge is divided into numerous segments of the fault line indicated by black lines. 'FZ' means fracture zone. The pink arrows indicate the direction of the Nazca plate and Antarctic plate movements as well as their rate of migration. They show that the Nazca plate is moving in an ENE direction, which is oblique to the boundary with the South American plate, while the Antarctic plate is moving in an E-W direction, which is almost perpendicular to the plate boundary. In addition, the Nazca plate migrates over four times faster than the Antarctic plate. The dark purple circle shows the Taitao Peninsula where the Chile ridge collides to the South American plate. The yellow line shows the plate boundary.

The geology of the Chile ridge is closely related to the geology of the Taitao Peninsula (East of the Chile ridge). This is because the Chile ridge subducts beneath the Taitao Peninsula, which give rise to unique lithologies there. The lithological units would be discussed from youngest to oldest, and Taitao Granites and Taitao Ophiolite would be our main focus.

==== Taitao Granites (Adakite-like rocks in Late-Miocene) ====
Adakite magmatism is formed by the melting of the Nazca plate's trailing edge. Due to the subduction of the Chile Ridge beneath the South American plate, there were intrusive magmatism which generates granite. This is also formed by the partial melting of the subducted oceanic crust. The young Nazca crust (less than 18 Myr old) are warmer so that the metamorphosed subducted basalts are melted. In normal mid-oceanic ridge, the presence of volatiles like water also reduces the solidus temperature. However, in Chile Ridge, there is relatively low-extent (20%) of partial melting of the lithosphere, the pressure and the temperature of the partial melting is less than 10 kbar and higher than 650° respectively. This is because the warm young Nazca plate has hindered high rate of cooling and dehydration. The partial melting of the Taitao granite creates plutons like the Cabo Raper adakitic pluton.

===== Characteristics of Taitao Granites =====
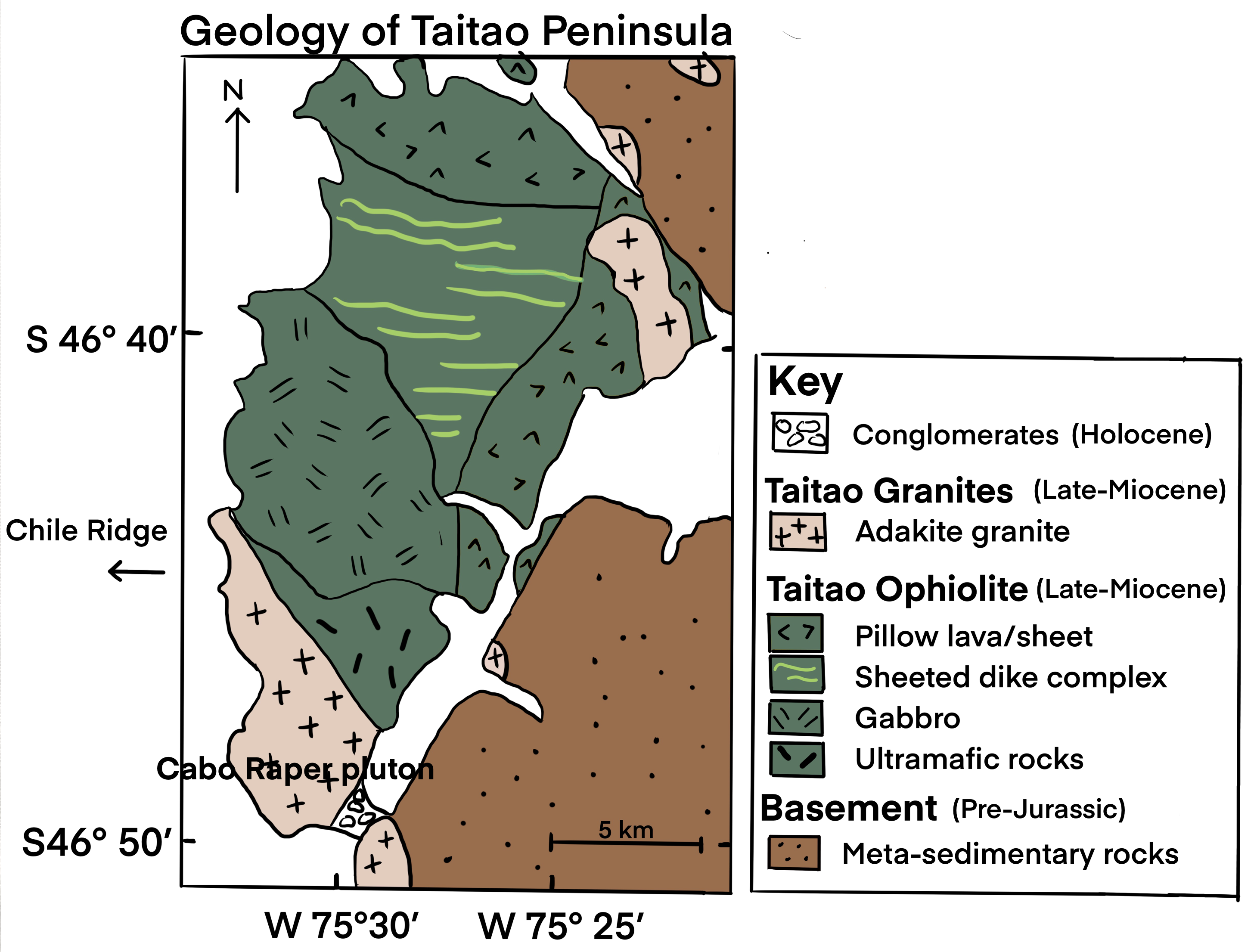
Fig-2 shows the geology of the Taitao Peninsula. Taitao granites and Taitao ophiolites would be mainly focused on in this part. Chile ridge is located west of the Taitao Peninsula, and the geology of Chile Ridge is closely associated with that of Taitao Peninsula.

Adakite is a felsic to intermediate rock and are usually calc-alkaline in composition. It is also silica-rich. The partial melting causes the alteration of the subducted basalts into eclogite and amphibolite which contains garnet.

==== Taitao Ophiolite (pillow lava, sheeted dikes, gabbro, ultramafic rocks in Late-Miocene) ====
Along the axis in the Chile ridge, magmatic rocks which are mafic to ultramafic are emplaced. For instance, the Taitao ophiolite complex is discovered in the westernmost of the Taitao Peninsula (east of the Chile Ridge), about 50 km southeast of the Chile triple junction. This is contributed by the obduction of the Nazca plate produced due to the convergence of the overriding South America plate and the Chile ridge Tres Montes segment. The obduction and the thrusting causes low-pressure metamorphism and forms the ophiolite complex. This metamorphism indicates the onset of hydrothermal alteration in a spreading ridge environment. There are also recent activities of acidic magmas in the Taitao Peninsula which allows the comparison between the past composition and current composition, history of the magma can be determined.

===== Characteristics of Taitao Ophiolite =====
Taitao ophiolite lithosphere forms a special sequence from the top to bottom: pillow lavas, sheeted dike complex, gabbros and ultramafic rock units. For the ultramafic rock units, it proved that there are at least two melting events that happened before.

The thermal configuration and the structure of the subduction zone affects the interactions of the oceanic lithosphere, seafloor sediments, the eroded rock from the overlying South American plate, and the sub-arc mantle wedge as well as the chemical composition of the magma, that melts from the mantle. Due to the subduction of oceanic ridges (Chile Ridge) beneath the South American plate which has occurred since 16 Ma, this caused the alteration in the thermal configuration and the geometry of the sub-arc mantle wedge, creating a distinct chemical composition of magma generations. That means by understanding the composition of the magma, specific conditions of subduction systems can be known. This has found that the slab window produced by the subduction of the ridge causes the generation of alkali basalt. The ridge-trench convergence and slab window generation aids the emplacement of the alkaline basalts.

Summary of the geology in Chile ridge
Age of the rocks	Kinds of magmatism	Rock type	Subduction settings	Composition
Holocene	/	Conglomerate	/	Variable compositions: rock fragments from Taitao granites, ophiolite,
Late-Miocene (3.92 Ma, 5.12 Ma)	Arc magmatism	Taitao Granites	low-extent partial melting of the altered basalt (from the trailing edge of Nazca plate) in a hot subduction event beneath the volcanic arc	intermediate to felsic, calc-alkaline, adakites: high Sr/Y and La/Yb ratio
Late-Miocene (5.19 Ma)	Arc magmatism	Taitao Ophiolite	obduction and uplift of the Nazca plate produced due to the convergence of the overriding South America plate and the Chile ridge, causing low-pressure metamorphism	mafic to ultramafic, olivine and pyroxene
Pre-Jurassic	/	Meta-sedimenary basement	/	/

=== Bathymetry ===
Bathymetry of the Chile ridge is inspected, which is the submarine topography that studies the depths of landforms under the water level. It is discovered that there are large abyssal hills extend along two sides of the ridge. The abyssal hills grow cyclically which is caused by the cyclic fault growth. During faulting cycles, the extension of the Chile ridge brought about 'diffusion' tectonic deformation which forms numerous tiny faults. The continuous divergence of the ridge causes the extensional strain to concentrate, the tiny faults to link together to generate tall and long abyssal-hill-scale faults. The huge faults push the old and inactive faults away from the ridge axis by extensional force. This process would repeat again. Therefore, the further the abyssal hill to the ridge axis, the older the age it is.

== The Chile Ridge movement ==
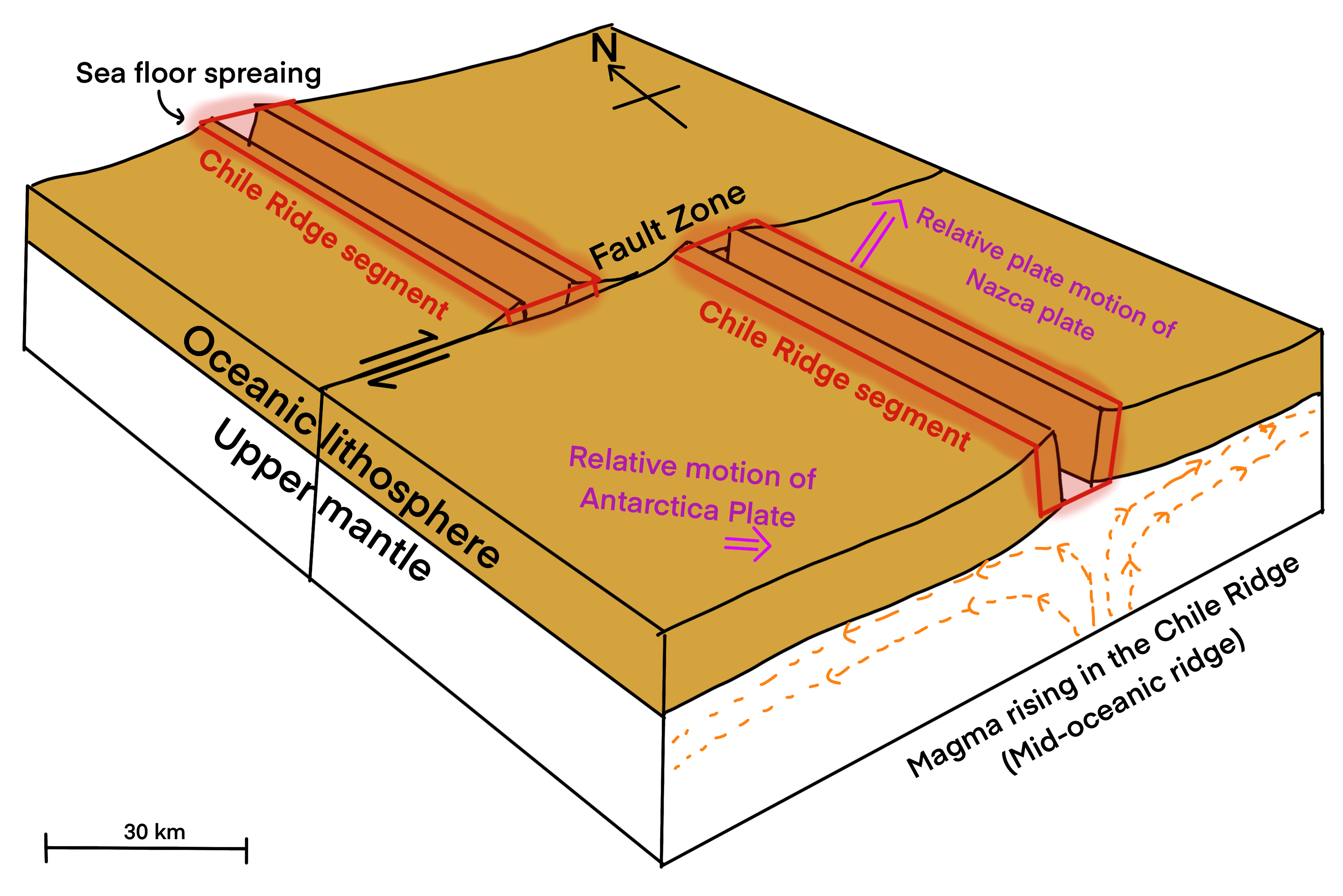
Fig-3 shows a close up view of the spreading Chile Ridge. With difference relative plane motion of Nazca plate and Antarctic plate, this creates an extensional force for sea floor spreading to carry out.

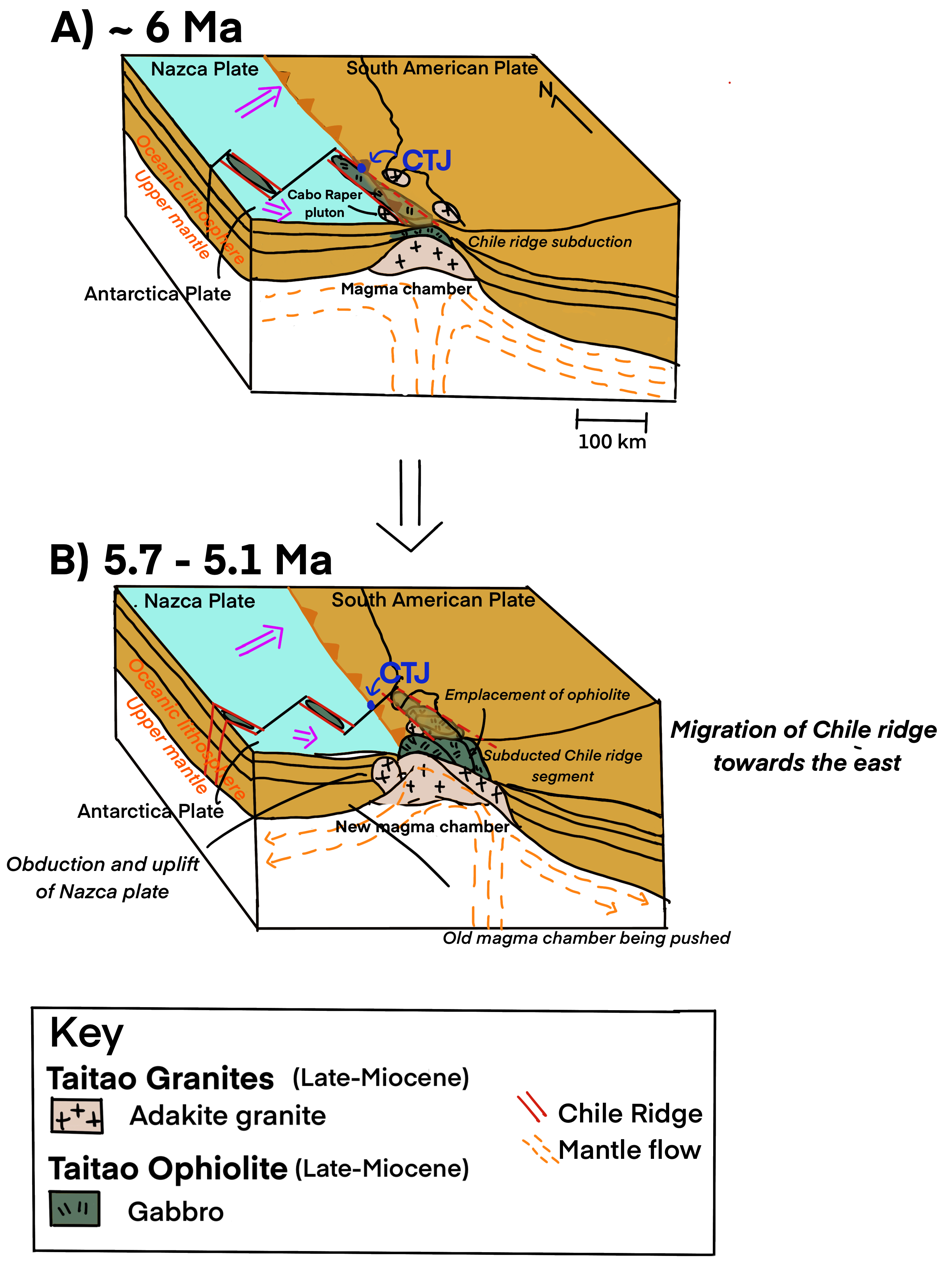
Fig-4 shows the Evolutionary diagram of the Chile Ridge Movement. The magmatism of under Taitao Peninsula from about 6 Ma to 5.7–5.1 Ma is shown. CTJ stands for Chile triple junction. A) The ridge is located at the edge of the Chile Trench. the Magma chambers developed and cause the upwelling of the ophiolite onto the surface of the spreading ridge. Cabo Raper pluton is also shown in the diagram. B) The old magma chamber is pushed away by the new magma chamber. Some ophiolite was also formed when the Nazca plate obducted and uplift. A new magma chamber was generated. The Chile Ridge segment subducts beneath the South American plate.

=== The spreading of the Chile Ridge ===
The Chile Ridge is formed by the divergence of the Nazca and Antarctic plates. It is spreading actively at the rate of about 6.4 – 7.0 cm/year since 5 Ma to present. The Late Miocene Nazca-Antarctic spreading ridge formation creates about 550 km-long Chile Ridge as there are differences in the convergence rates between Nazca and Antarctic plates. According to the results from space geodetic observations, Nazca-South America converges four times faster than that of Antarctica-South America.

In addition, the direction of the Nazca plate migration is different from the Antarctic plate migration since 3 Ma. The direction that Nazca plate moves is ENE, while the Antarctic plate is ESE. The net diverging movement of the two plates contributes to the spreading of the Chile Ridge.

Plate motion of Nazca plate and Antarctic plate
Name of the plate	Direction of movement	Rate of movement
Nazca plate	N77°E (ENE)	6.6–8.5 cm/year
Antarctic plate	N100°E (ESE)	1.85 cm/year

=== Migration and subduction of the Chile ridge ===
The subduction of the ridge started is an oblique subduction with 10° – 12° oblique to the Chile trench since 14 Ma, which subducts beneath the southeastern Southern Patagonia. Thus it is found that both the Nazca-South American plate collision and Antarctic-South American plate collision have been taken place at the same time when the Chile ridge is separating, i.e. segments of Chile Ridge have been subducting beneath the South American plate. Due to the difference in the convergence rate, the formation of a slab window is favoured. Slab window is a gap underneath the South America plate, where the overriding South America plate has only little lithospheric mantle supporting it and is directly exposed to the hot asthenospheric mantle.

The experimental results from the magnetic anomalies within the oceanic crust suggest that about in 14–10 Ma (late-Miocene), some of the Chile Ridge segments were subducted beneath the Southern Patagonian Peninsula (located between 48° and 54°S) subsequently. From 10 Ma to the present, Chile Ridge was separated into several short segments by the fracture zones, and the segments of the ridge are subducted between 46° and 48° S. The above findings have proven that Chile Ridge has been encountered a northward migration. Thus it has been found that the spreading rate of Chile Ridge from 23 Ma to the present has slowed down. While the spreading rate of the ridge is correlated to time of the collisions of ridge and trench. Some studies have different discoveries in the rate of spreading which shows that the ridge may have spread uniformly for about 31 km/Myr half spreading rate starting from 5.9 Ma.

=== Associated seismicity ===
In the Chile Ridge Subduction Project (CRSP), seismic stations are deployed in the Chile triple junction (CTJ). The tectonic activity and seismicity are mainly driven by the subduction of Chile Ridge. A slab window is formed as the Nazca and Antarctic plates continue to diverge when colliding with Chile trench, a gap is created as new lithosphere production is becomes very slow. Moderate to high offshore seismicities for magnitude higher than 4 is detected in the segmented Chile Ridge as well as the transform faults. It is predicted that the subduction of the spreading Chile Ridge under South America to the north of the Chile triple junction give rise to the seismic events. Furthermore, intraplate seismicity in the overriding South American plate is more likely resulted from the deformation of the Liquiñe-Ofqui fault system.

==== Chiloe microplate ====
This is a tiny plate between Nazca plate and South American plate, it locates east of the Chile ridge. It is proved that Chiloe microplate (Fig-5, 6) is migrated northwards relative to the South American plate which is rather immobile. The Golfo de Penas basin is formed because of the northward movement of Chiloe microplate.

==== Seismicity of Liquiñe-Ofqui fault system in the Aysén Region ====
The Liquiñe-Ofqui fault system is a right-lateral strike-slip fault separating Chiloe microplate and the South America plate. The northward migration of Chiloe microplate along the Liquiñe-Ofqui fault creates the Golfo de Penas basin in the late Miocene period.

The Liquiñe-Ofqui fault is a fast-slipping fault (with a geodetic rate of 6.8–28 mm/yr). Intraplate seismicity has mainly been taken place in this fault system. Also, enormous stress from the Nazca plates and South American plate collision has accumulated along the fault system. Throughout history, only limited seismic studies have been conducted in the Aysén Region, southern Chile. There is only an event of seismic magnitude higher than 7 happening in 1927. This hinders the finding in seismicity near the Chile Ridge. Nevertheless, in 2007, the Liquiñe-Ofqui fault system releases the accumulated stress brought by the subduction of Nazca underneath the South America plate with seismicity magnitude reaching 7 in an earthquake. Recently, 274 seismic events have been detected in 2004–2005.

==== Seismicity of the Patagonian slab window ====
There is an intraplate seismicity gap between 47° and 50°S (area with abnormal high heat flow), which coincides with the Patagonian slab window, disrupting most seismic events. The local seismic data only reveals a low-magnitude (magnitude lower than 3.4) seismic event, which is not related to tectonic process. The reason behind this is that the Antarctic plate undergoes shallow subduction which causes very limited seismic deformation. (Fig-5)

Frequency values of strike-slip faulting of different regions
Regions	where the seismicity is concentrated	depth of focus (km)	magnitude of seismic event	Orientation of the maximum compressional stress
North of the Chile triple junction	intraplate seismic events concentrated along Liquiñe-Ofqui fault system	4–21	1.5–6	ENE–WSW (oblique to the continental margin of South American plate of N10°)
South of the Chile triple junction (between 46.5°-50°S)	seismic events sparsely populated in Southern Patagon	12–15	5	ESE–WNW

== Geological formation related to the Chile Ridge movement ==
=== Patagonia slab window ===
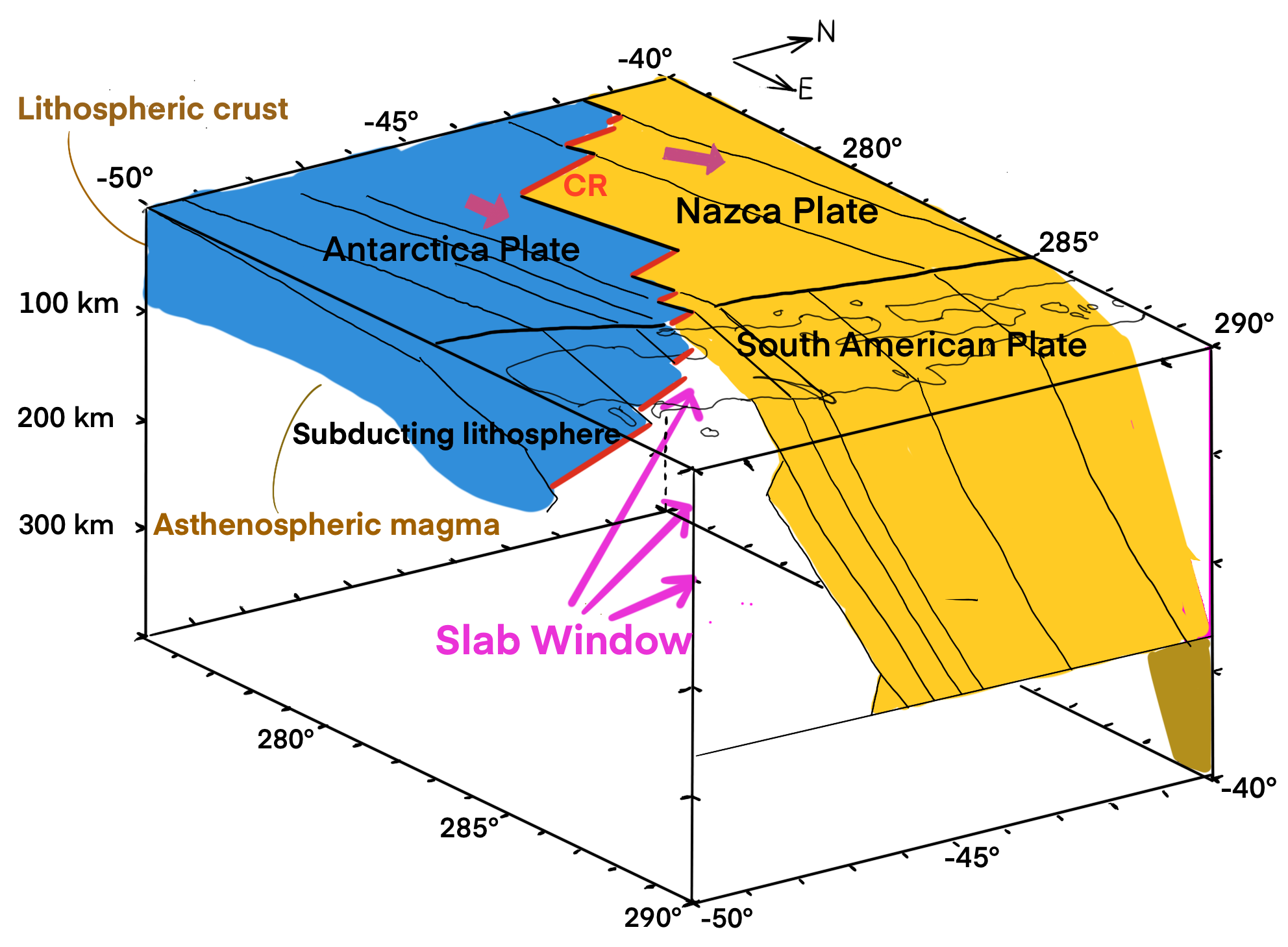
Fig-5 This sketch shows the cross-section of the slab window. The Nazca plate and Antarctic plate are colliding with South American plate.

The most obvious impact of the subduction of the Chile ridge is the formation of slab window. It is formed when the segments of separating Chile Ridge subducts under the southern South America plate. The trailing edge of the Nazca plate is completely melted in the subduction zone, and the leading edge of the Antarctic plate diverges, a widening gap is created between the two plates as very little crust is melted after subduction. In this case, only a very little amount of magma is produced underneath the slab window. The mantle in the slab window is rather hotter than the mantle that melts from the lithospheric crust, and the generation of magma is very slow. This is due to low-extent of hydration to the subduction zone, decreasing mantle convection velocity, as the production of magma in the subduction zone is mainly driven by the hydration that lowers the partial melting of the crust. A volcanic arc gap is formed above the slab window as the magma melted from the crust convects slowly which hampers the volcanism. The ridge segment between Taitao and Darwin transform faults are currently located near the Chile Trench and collide with the South American plate.

The presence of slab window underneath southern South America plate has been proven by the research which aims at determining the lithosphere and upper mantle structure proximate to the Chile Ridge. An intraplate seismic gap is recorded which coincides with the Patagonian slab window location. The experimental results of the P wave travel-time tomography show there is low-velocity zone in the predicted slab window location, migrating eastward with increasing depth.

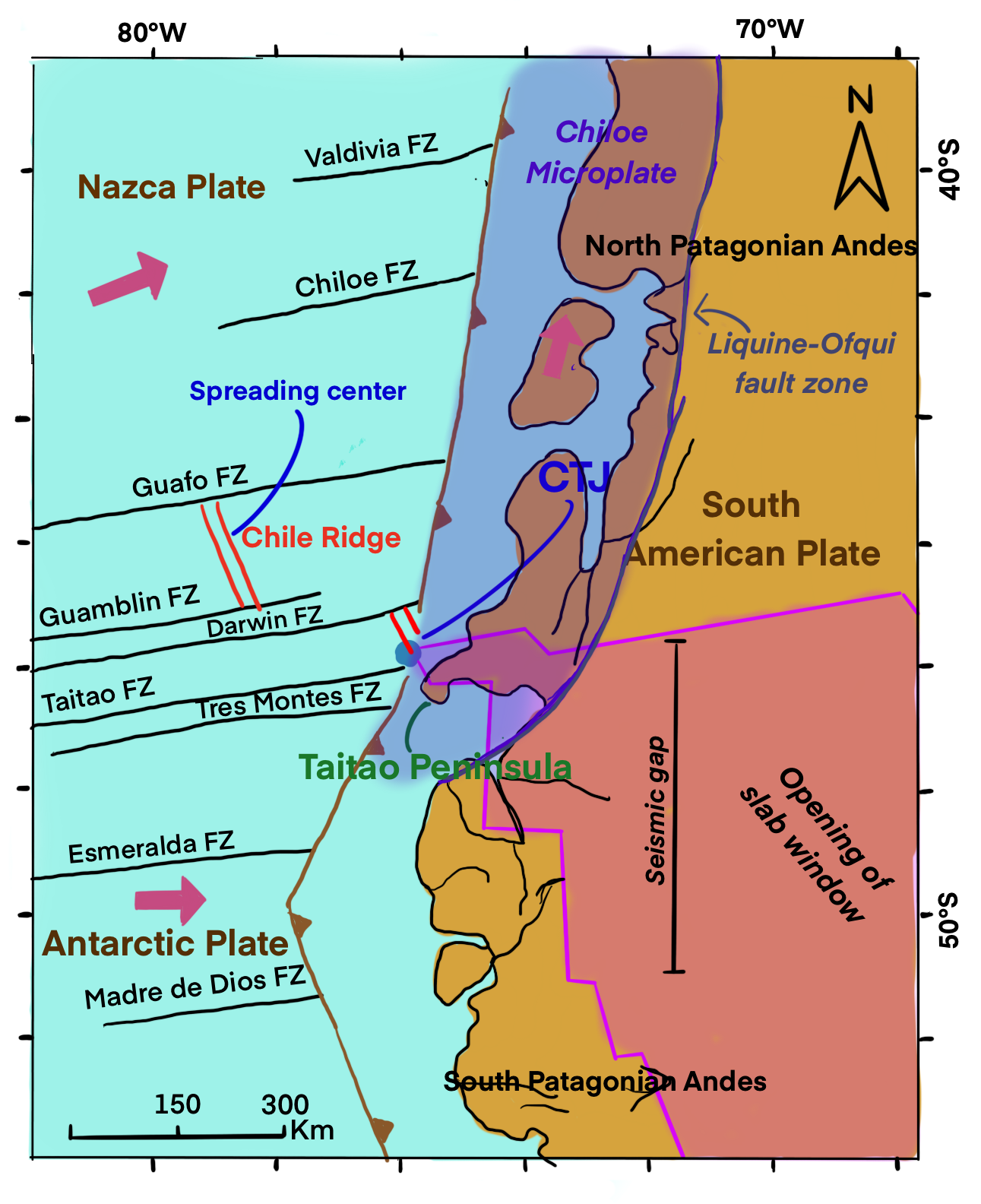
Fig-6 This figure shows the slab window caused by the subduction of Chile ridge, slab window also brings about a seismic gap. The black lines are fault zones (FZ) and the red lines are Chile ridge segments. The dark blue spot is the Chile triple junction (CTJ). The purple area reveals the Chiloe microplate and Liquine-Ofqui fault zone are located between the Chiloe microplate and the main South American plate.

=== Tectonic erosion and emplacement of ophiolite ===
Other than the generation of the slab window, the Chile Ridge subduction into the Chile triple junction also influences the Taitao Peninsula. First of all is the tectonic erosion, Neogene basaltic volcanism and tectonic uplift in Late Cretaceous. Obduction and thrusting of Nazca plate produced due to the convergence of the overriding South America plate and the Chile ridge, causing low-pressure metamorphism, facilitated the emplacement of ophiolite complex.

=== Chile triple junction ===
The Chile triple junction is the intersection of Nazca, Antarctica and South American plate. The position of the junction shifts over time, and depends whether the spreading ridge subducts or the transform fault subducts beneath the South American plate. When the spreading ridge subducts, the triple junction shifts northwards; but if the fracture zone subducts, the triple junction shifts southwards. The junction has shifted to the north starting from the onset of Chile Ridge subduction since 17 Ma after the rupture of the Nazca-Antarctic-Phoenix triple junction. Since then, the Chile triple junction has arrived to its current position in the western Taitao Peninsula. Prior to 10 Ma, Chile triple junction reaches the southern Taitao peninsula. Currently, the temperature of Chile triple junction below the depth of 10 – 20 km is predicted to be 800 – 900 °C.

=== Ridge axes ===
The ridge axes are the middle part of the ridge where newer crusts are formed. The central ridge axis of Chile Ridge is trending in the direction of north-northwest (NNE). Ridge axes are also known as topographic axial rift valleys. With the help of satellite altimetry data and magnetic data, gravity lows are discovered near the ridge axes.

=== Fracture zones ===
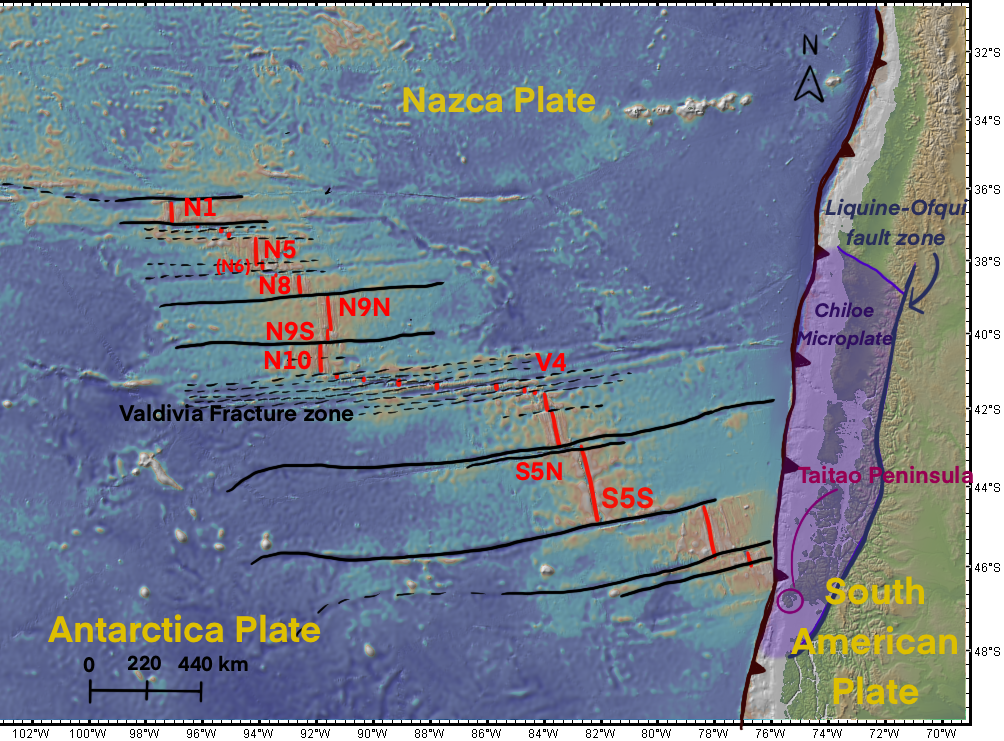
Fig-7 This picture shows the several segments of Chile ridge which is divided by numerous transform fault zones. The segment numbers are shown in red words next to the ridge segments. The Chiloe microplate is located at the east of the Chile ridge and the Liquiñe-Ofqui fault zone is located between the Chiloe microplate and the main South American plate. Figure made with GeoMapApp (www.geomapapp.org)

It is also named as fault zones. They are the transform faults and separate the Chile Ridge into segments, causing the entire ridge axis to trend southeastward. Fracture zones are trending east-northeast (ENE). The total length of the Chile ridge axis offset is 1380 km caused by the 18 fault zones, among the fault zones, there are also 2 complex fault systems. The longest fault zones are Chiloe fault with 234 km long, and Guafo fault being the shortest (39 km). Through various research on the magnetic and bathymetry data, fracture zones' locations are located. While major fault zones are surveyed by the bathymetry method and defined as troughs. Same bathymetry data also discovered the Fault zones in East Pacific Rise as well as the low-velocity-spreading Mid-Atlantic ridge.

==== Segmentation of Chile Ridge ====
Chile Ridge is divided into a wide range of several short spreading segments which have different lengths and offset distances, in the following section, 7 segments will be discussed. From the table below, it reveals that the spreading ridge segments range in length from about 20 to 200 km, the offsets within segments are about 10 to 1100 km. There are actually a total of 10 first-order ridge segments in the northern ridge (N1-N10), 5 first-order ridge segments (V1-V5) in Valdivia fracture zone, 5 first-order ridge segments (S1-S5) are in the southern ridge. Moreover, both segments N9 and S5 are divided into two parts by non-transform offsets. The table above summarized the longer, more regular and less complicated faults: N1, N5, N8, N9N, N9S, N10, V4, S5N, and S5S.

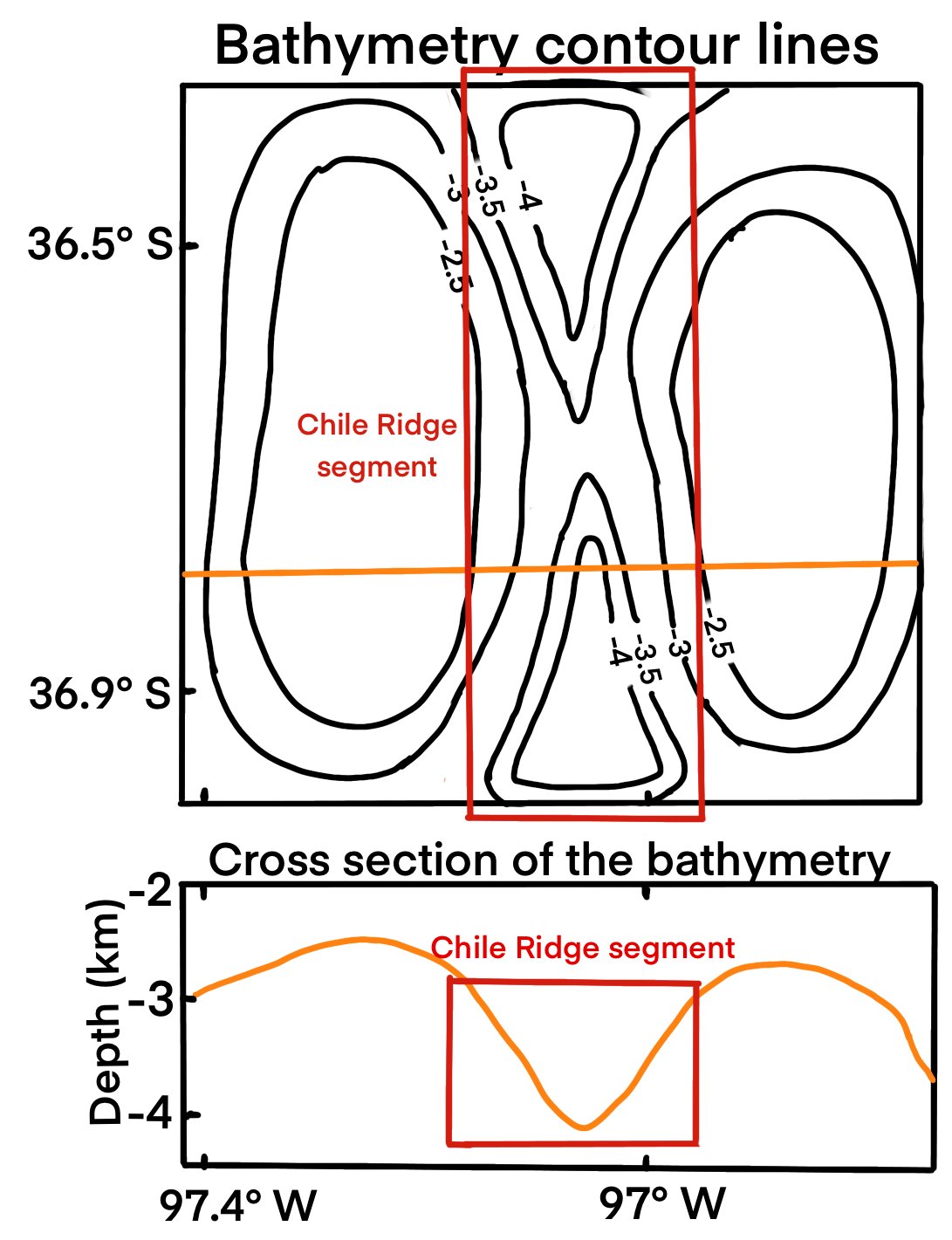
Fig-8 The contour lines show the hourglass morphology of one of the segments of the Chile Ridge. Below is the cross-section of the Chile Ridge topography.

===== Hourglass morphology =====
Deep contours are located along the segment ends while shallow contours are located at the segment center. The segment center is narrower as the while the axial valley located at the segment ends are wider. This forms an hourglass morphology. (Fig-8)

===== Valdivia fracture zone =====
It is located in the middle of the Chile ridge (Fig-1, 2, 7), and separates the ridge into northern and southern sections, discovered by the bathymetry and magnetic profiles study, as well as the gravity anomaly detection. The Valdivia Fault Zone has caused the offset of the north and south Chile ridge for more than 600 km in the E-W direction. There are six fault zones between the Valdivia Fault Zone.

Summary of the segments of Chile Ridge (Fig-7)
Name of the segment	Length (km)	Number of orders (No. of hourglass)	Location relative to the Chile Ridge	Morphology
N1	70	First-order	Northernmost; Bounded by 1000 km-long transform fault zones in both north and south	Asymmetric hourglass, Ridge-parallel abyssal hills present on both sides of the axial valley
N5	95	First-order	Offset east of N1 for 250 km; Bounded by 'pseudofaults' between the southern end of N5 and the northern end of N6, which offset 20 km east	Asymmetric hourglass (located in short volcanic chains)
N8	65	First-order	Offset east of N9 for 80 km, bounded by a transform fault in N7 in the north, and a transform fault with offset N9 80 km	More obvious hourglass (deeper segment center, local minimum is at the shallowest part of the segment)
N9	140	Second-order (N9N and N9S)	Offset east of N8 for 80 km, and offset east of N10 for 25 km, N9 are broken into two parts by a non-transform offset (N9N and N9S), bound by the transform offset in the north and a transform offset N9 by 80 km in the south	
N9N	110		Bound in the south by NTO which offset east of N9S 8 km	Two obvious hourglasses (deep, wide axial valley)
N9S	30			Semi-hourglass (shallow hourglass structure)
N10	95	First-order	Offset west of N9 for 25 km, bounded by a transform fault that offsets west of N9 in the north, and Valdivia fracture zone in the south which offset 600 km in E-W direction	Hourglass (decrease in relief towards the spreading center, i.e. middle of the ridge segment)
V4	20	First-order	In the Valdivia fracture zone, bounded by N10 and S5 transform fault segments in the north and south, segment lengths are very short.	/
S5	115	Second-order (S5N and S5S)	Bounded by Valdivia fracture zone transform fault in the north, and a transform fault in the south that offset next segment 60 km eastward	Hourglass
S5N	70			Hourglass
S5S	45			More obvious hourglass (inside corner of southern section is more shallow than the outside corner)

== Interaction between Chile Ridge and Chile Trench ==
Geophysical and geothermal analysis in the southern Chile triple junction has been examined. Magnetic and bathymetric data have been recorded across the Chile Ridge which recognizes a slight transformation in the configuration of the spreading ridge when the ridge converges with the trench.

The overriding South America plate is dominantly impacted by the ridge collision. The Chile-Peru Trench becomes steeper and narrower when the Chile Ridge is subducting. Chile Ridge segment within the Taitao fracture zone collides with the southern end of the trench. The collision of the ridge may also be associated with the obduction process onto the landward trench slope. Geothermal data along the southern triple junction are measured. The heat flow analysis in the collision zone of the trench indicated a high value of heat pulse (345 mW/m^{2}) related to the Chile ridge subduction in the lower part of the trench. Furthermore, by the application of bottom simulating reflectors (BSR), more convincing evidence of the existence of high heat flow underneath the trench slope, as a wider range of heat flow observations grid is shown from the north to the south of the triple junction. Also, the hypothesized conductive heat flow is consistent with the heat flow data from BSR.

== Importance of the spreading ridge subduction ==
Understanding the spreading ridge subduction is crucial as it controls the evolution of continental crust. The subduction of the Chile Ridge beneath the Chile Trench provides a suitable analog for the initiation of the Archean continental crust via the melting of deep oceanic crust. This is because the Chile Ridge subduction is the only example in the world that the overriding plate is a continental one. The correlations between the rocks in the past can also be examined. The ridge trench interaction can also be studied.

In addition, due to the presence of the Patagonian slab window and the obduction of the Nazca plate, the geological process that happened historically are not the same. Therefore, the Chile Ridge subduction is not conformable with the uniformitarian principle (geological process happened now is the same with that in the past).

=== Other example of spreading ridge subduction ===
==== The Kula-Farallon/Resurrection ridge subduction ====
The subduction of Kula-Farallon/Resurrection ridge started during Late Cretaceous-Paleocene, this is currently located at the Chugach complex, Alaska where mafic-ultramafic high grade metamorphism is found nowadays. The ridge subduction controls the magmatism of the North American boundary.

== See also ==
- Liquiñe-Ofqui fault
- Peru–Chile Trench
- Subduction
- Taitao Peninsula
