= Tres Montes Peninsula =

Peninsula in Chile

Coordinates: 46°50′50″S 75°20′04″W

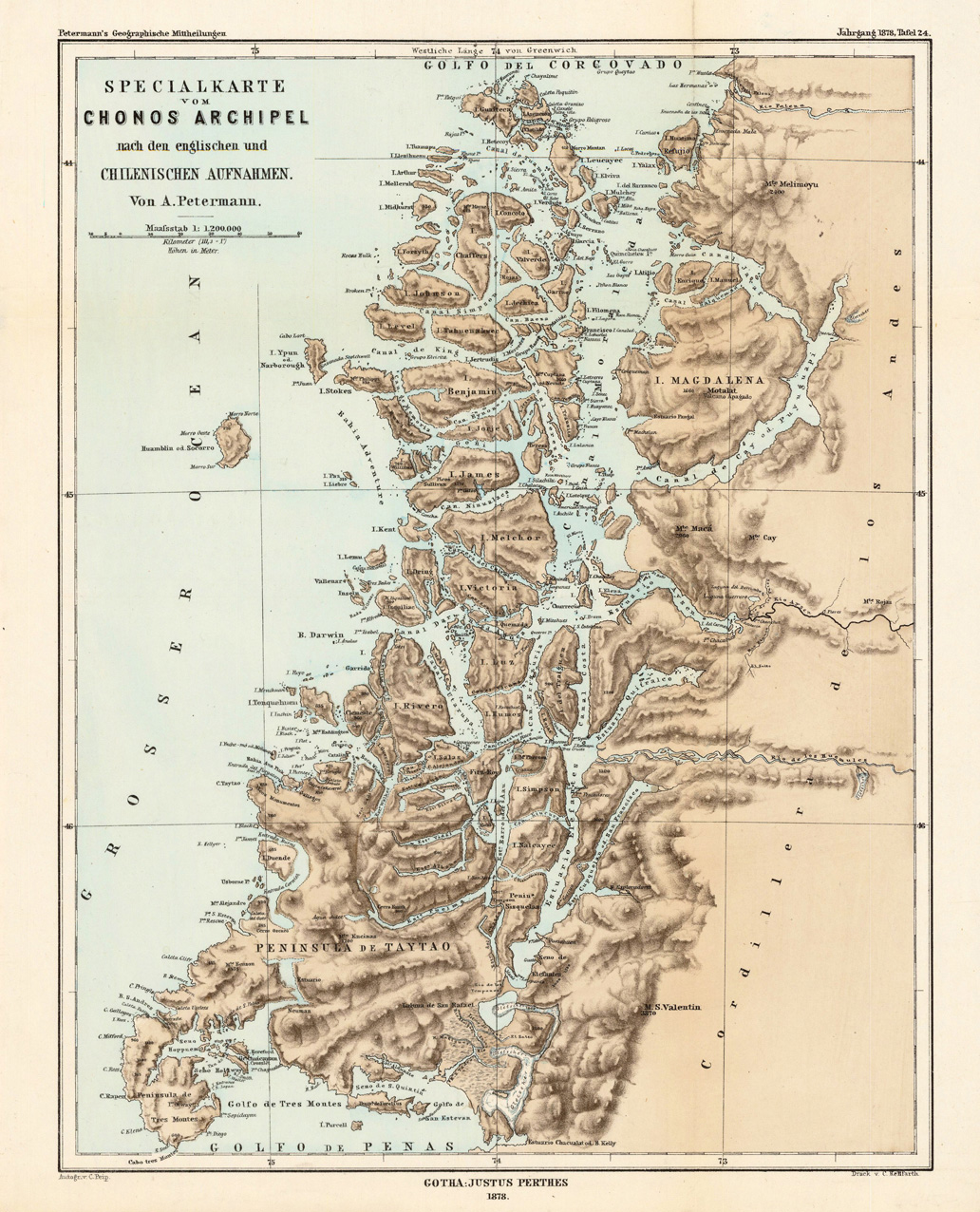
Left down: Península de Taitao, Península de tres Montes, Cabo Tres Montes in a German Map of 1878

The Tres Montes Peninsula (Spanish: Península Tres Montes, English: Three Hills Peninsula) is a southwestward projection of Taitao Peninsula which in turn connects to the mainland of Chile by the narrow Isthmus of Ofqui. The peninsula is situated in Aysén del General Carlos Ibáñez del Campo Region close to the Chile Triple Junction of the Nazca, Antarctic and South American plates.

The peninsula is famous for the dangerous waters surrounding it. In the 1850s Chilean navy officer Francisco Hudson read Robert FitzRoy's book Sailing Directions for South America concluding there was a possible north–south sailing route that allowed communication between Chiloé Archipelago to the Straits of Magellan without rounding Tres Montes Peninsula. This possibility, implying Tres Montes was not part of the mainland but part of an island, led him to explore Chonos Archipelago, Taitao Peninsula and San Rafael Lake from January to March 1857.

== See also ==
- Chonos Archipelago
- Fjords and channels of Chile
