= Chile triple junction =

Place where the South American, Nazca and Antarctic tectonic plates meet

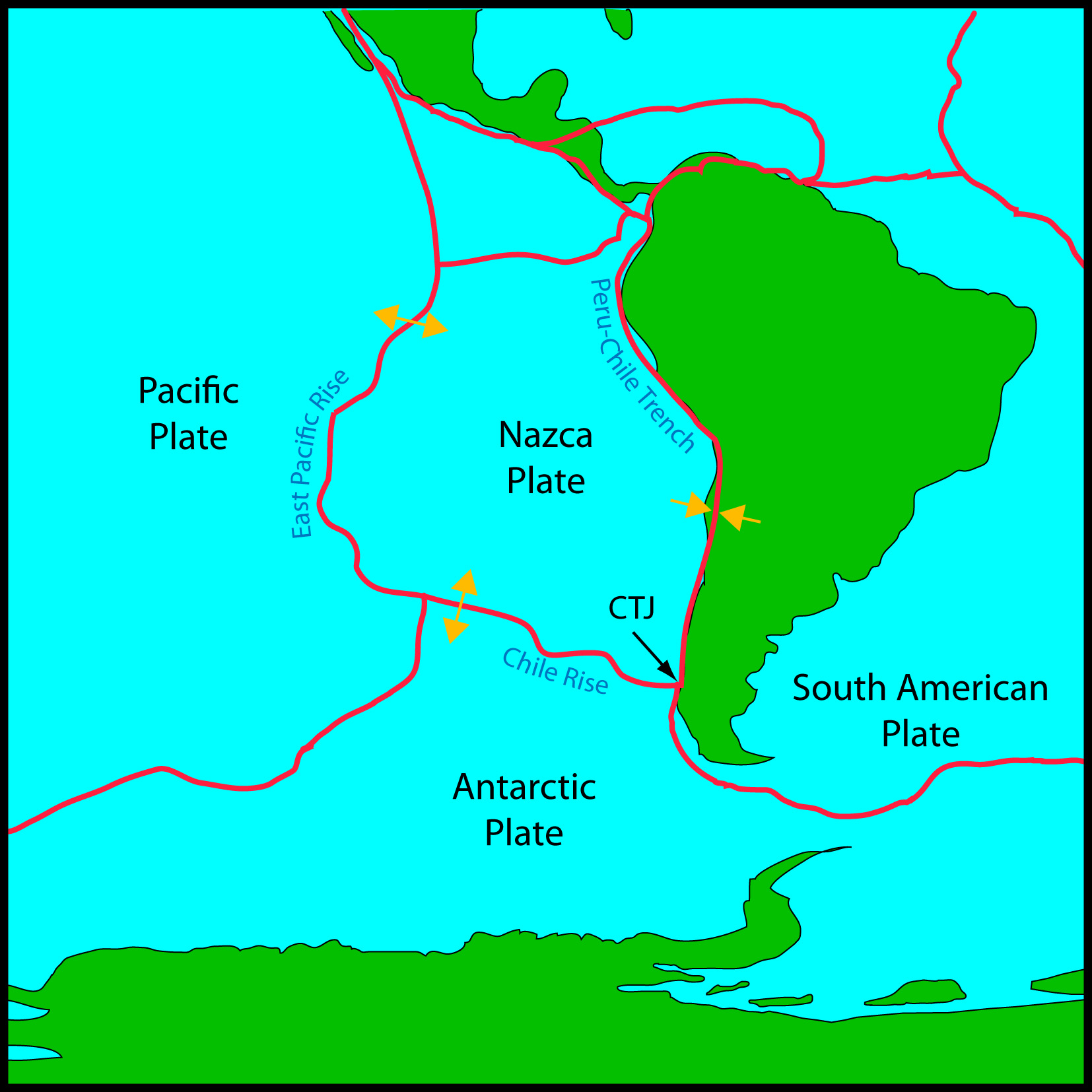
Chile triple junction (CTJ)

The Chile triple junction (or Chile margin triple junction) is a geologic triple junction located on the seafloor of the Pacific Ocean off Taitao and Tres Montes Peninsula on the southern coast of Chile. Here three tectonic plates meet: the South American plate, the Nazca plate and the Antarctic plate. This triple junction is unusual in that it consists of a mid-oceanic ridge, the Chile Rise, being subducted under the South American plate at the Peru–Chile Trench. The Chile triple junction is the boundary between the Chilean Rise and the Chilean margin, where the Nazca, Antarctic, and South American plates meet at the trench.

== Tectonic plate movement ==
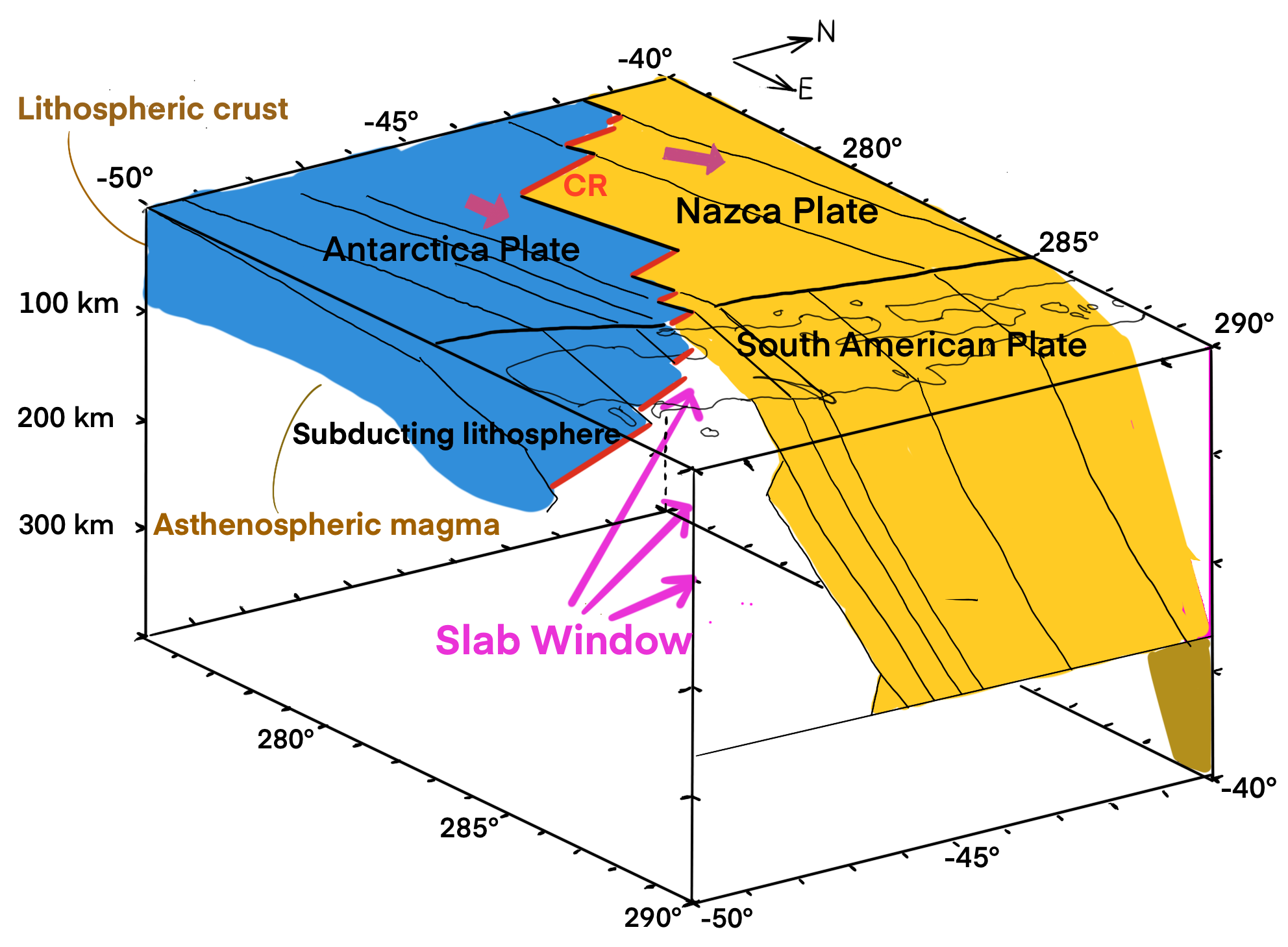
The Nazca plate and Antarctic plate are colliding with the South American plate at the Chile triple junction.

The Antarctic plate started to subduct beneath South America 14 million years ago in the Miocene epoch forming the Chile triple junction. At first the Antarctic plate subducted only in the southernmost tip of Patagonia, meaning that the Chile triple junction lay near the Strait of Magellan. As the southern part of Nazca plate and the Chile Rise became consumed by subduction and the more northerly regions of the Antarctic plate begun to subduct beneath Patagonia so that the Chile triple junction advanced gradually to its present position in front of Taitao Peninsula at 46°15'. The South American plate is moving away from the Nazca plate and moving in a direction to the north of the Chile ridge spreading center, while the Nazca plate is subducting under the South American plate at a rate of about 80–90 mm/a north of the triple junction. The triple junction of the Chile Ridge, the Chile Trench and the Antarctic plate collided about 14 Ma ago near the latitude of Tierra del Fuego. Since then it has migrated north, with the actual triple junction now located at 46°12'S. The Chilean margin consists of the Nazca-Antarctic spreading center, the Chile Rise or Chile Ridge, and the Chile Ridge, with the Nazca-Antarctic spreading center being at 46.5° S, the Chile Rise or Chile Ridge being more prominent in the south. Additionally around 14 Ma, the Chile Rise collided with the South American continental plate. The high relief topography caused the trench to be devoid of sediment at the Chile-South America junction.

=== Subduction ===
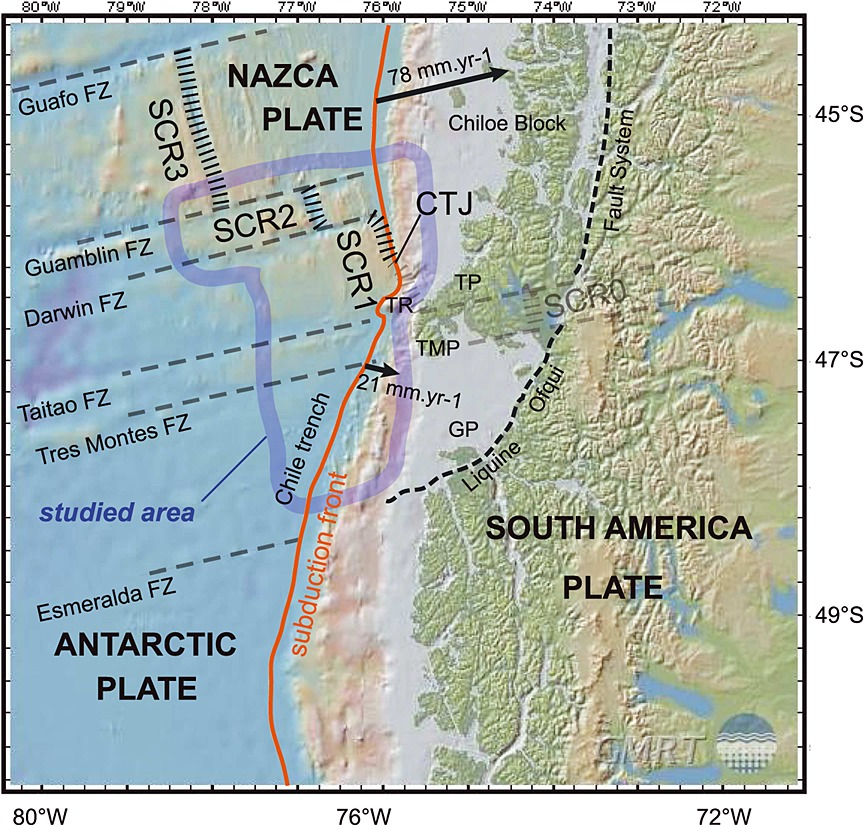
The Chile triple junction, a geologic junction off the southern coast of Chile where the South American, Nazca and Antarctic tectonic plates meet

Subduction accretion is an important process that leads to mountain building and the growth of continents, but it is also associated with the destruction of forearc material. The impact of topographic features, such as topographic features of mountain ranges and faulting, is one important mechanism. An impact between a spreading ridge and a continental forearc can result in a thermal pulse within the forearc. This thermal pulse can be quantified using apatite fission track data and the thermal maturity of organic carbon in the forearc sediment. Several authors have suggested that subduction erosion or slip during earthquakes may be responsible for the uplift of the Coastal Cordillera, a trench-parallel morphostructural system in north Chile.

== Geologic characteristics ==
The Juan Fernández Ridge (JFR) is a prominent feature on the oceanic Nazca lithosphere located west of the Chile Trench. The O'Higgins seamount group, surrounded by a topographic swell, acts as a barrier between the north and south half of the Chile Trench.

=== Sedimentary compositions ===
The continental basement of southern Chile is mainly formed of metasedimentary and metavolcanic rocks of Paleozoic age intruded by Cretaceous and Tertiary, acidic, I-type plutonic rocks of the Patagonian Batholith. In the southern-central Chilean margin, the sediment in the Chile trench is confined to the Chile Rise. The trench is unusually poor in sediments north of the JFR, but is heavily sedimented south of the Chile triple junction. The accretionary prism is confined between the two large topographic features, the Chile Rise and the JFR. The northern Chilean margin is poor in sediments due to low sediment supply from the Andes and the presence of the JFR, which acts as a barrier to the transport of trench sediments from the southern Chile trench to the north.

=== Ophiolites ===
Taitao Peninsula lies near the triple junction and various geological features, such as the Taitao ophiolite, are related to the dynamics of the triple junction. Ridge and trench collisions are clear indications of the subduction history around the Pacific Ocean and are likely a dominant mechanism of ophiolite positioning. This results in a rapid sinking and spreading along with magmatic activity near the oceanic trench.

== See also ==
- Liquiñe-Ofqui Fault
