= Biobío-Aluminé Fault Zone =

The Biobío-Aluminé Fault Zone is a northwest-trending geological fault zone in south-central Chile and Argentina. The fault aligns with the middle-upper course of Bío Bío River where fault traces are largely covered with fluvial gravels. The northernmost reaches of the north-south Liquiñe-Ofqui Fault intersect and displace the Biobío-Aluminé Fault Zone.
