= Taitao Peninsula =

Peninsula in Chile

Coordinates: 46°30′S 74°25′W

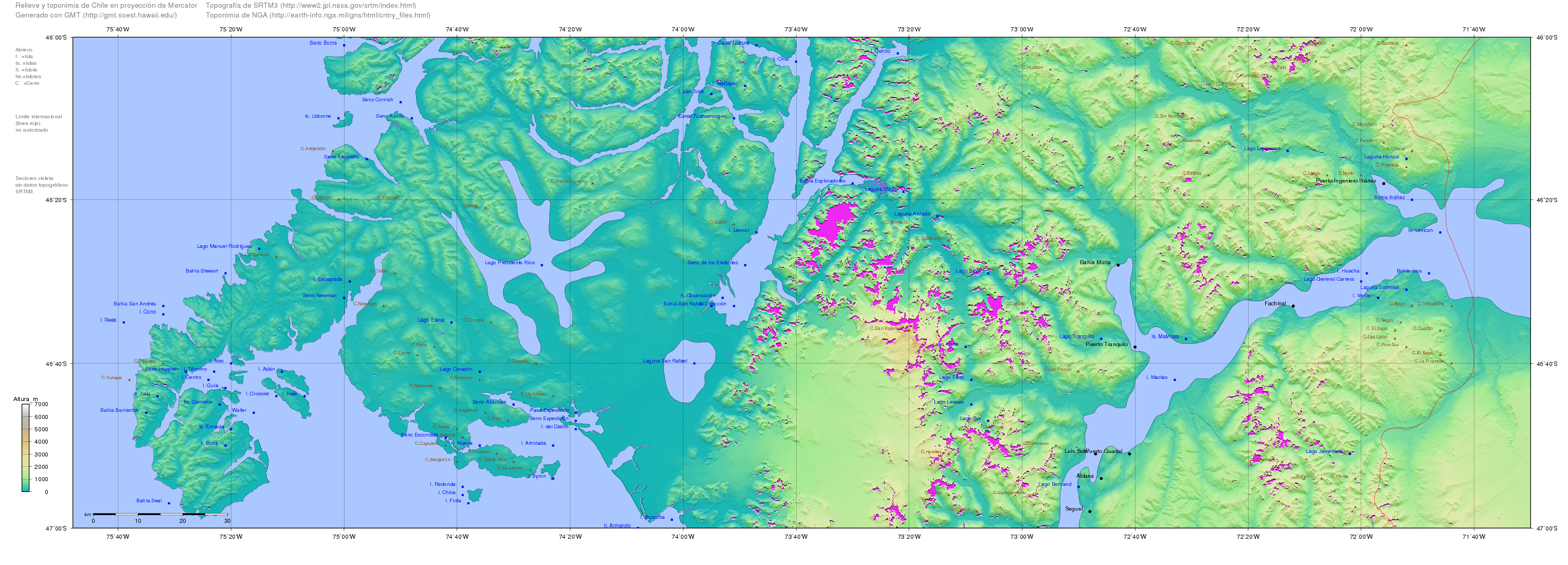
Península de Taitao: The SRTM map doesn't show the connection between the Laguna San Rafael and the Moraleda Channel.

The Taitao Peninsula (Spanish: Península de Taitao) is a westward-facing landmass on the south-central Pacific west coast of Chile. The peninsula is connected to the mainland via the narrow Isthmus of Ofqui, over which tribal peoples and early missionaries often traveled to avoid navigating the peninsula's treacherous waters, carrying their boats and belongings overland between the Moraleda Channel and Gulf of Penas. The Taitao Peninsula is situated in the Aysén del General Carlos Ibáñez del Campo Region, and part of the landmass is located inside the boundaries of Laguna San Rafael National Park. The Presidente Ríos Lake, with a surface area of 352 square kilometres (136 sq mi), lies in the center of the peninsula. A southward-incurving projection of its outer shoreline is known as Tres Montes peninsula, the most southerly point of the cape of the same name.

Spanish explorers and Jesuits that sailed south from Chiloé Archipelago in the 17th and 18th centuries regularly avoided rounding Taitao Peninsula entering instead the Gulf of Penas after a brief land crossing at the isthmus of Ofqui. While attempting to pass the Gulf of Penas in 1741, a storm caught the British ship, HMS Wager, causing it to wreck on (the eventual) Wager Island, on the Guayaneco Archipelago. Some of the survivors, including John Byron, were led into the Spanish settlements of the Chiloé Archipelago by the Chono chieftain Martín Olleta via Presidente Ríos Lake.

Writer Benjamín Subercaseaux visited the Taitao Peninsula in 1946, reportedly having seen footprints and fresh human feces he thought indicated the indigenous Chono people, as known from the historical record, still lived in the region.

As result of its difficult terrain and rugged isolation, the peninsula is largely unexplored.

== Flora ==
The vegetation of the peninsula varies based on exposure and other factors. Along the western fringes of the peninsula, towards Tres Montes, a shrubland of roughly 2-meter-tall (6.6 ft) Pilgerodendron uvifera and Nothofagus nitida grows. Amidst this shrubland, occasional peat bogs can be found, and forests dot the landscape. In the central parts of the peninsula, including on the shores of Presidente Ríos Lake, forests of Nothofagus betuloides and Drimys winteri can be found. Cushion peatlands of Donatia fascicularis and Oreobolus obtusangulus occupy the higher mountains of the peninsula. To the east, near San Rafael Lake, a N. betuloides forest with an understory of Desfontainia fulgens, Blechnum magellanicum, Fuchsia magellanica and Raukaua laetevirens grows.

== Geology ==
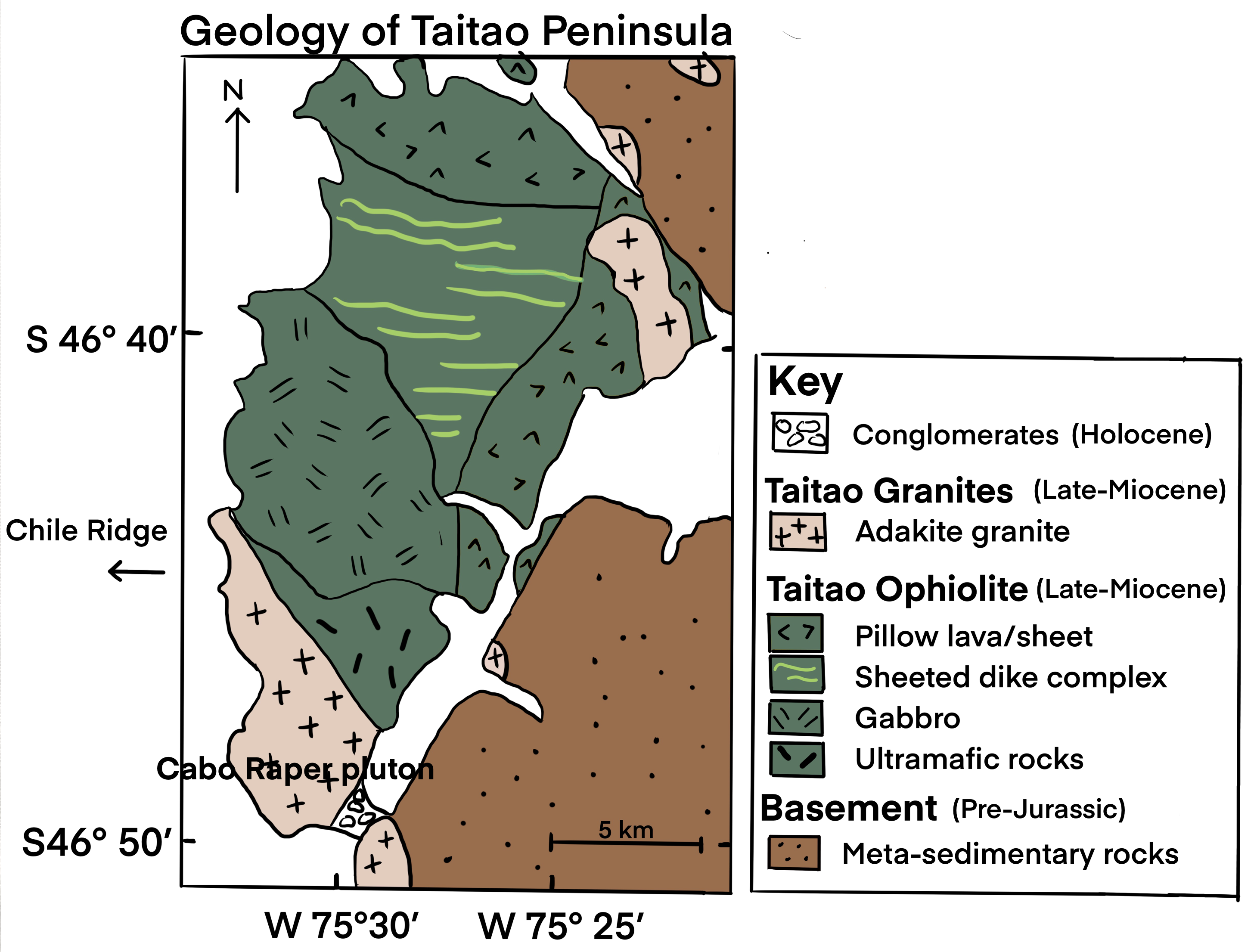
Geological map of the Peninsula

Beneath the peninsula is the Chile Triple Junction, a point of contact between the tectonic plates of Antarctica, South America and Nazca. Taitao ophiolite, and other geological features, are associated with the triple junction. As the Chile Rise has subducted beneath the South American Plate at the Taitao Peninsula, three ridge–continent collisions have occurred over the last 5 million years ago, approximately.

== Sources ==
Bibliography

- Luebert, Federico; Pliscoff, Patricio (2017) [2006]. Sinopsis bioclimática y vegetacional de Chile (in Spanish) (2nd ed.). Santiago de Chile: Editorial Universitaria. p. 381. ISBN 978-956-11-2575-9.
