= Nazca plate =

Oceanic tectonic plate in the eastern Pacific Ocean basin

Coordinates: 15°S 85°W

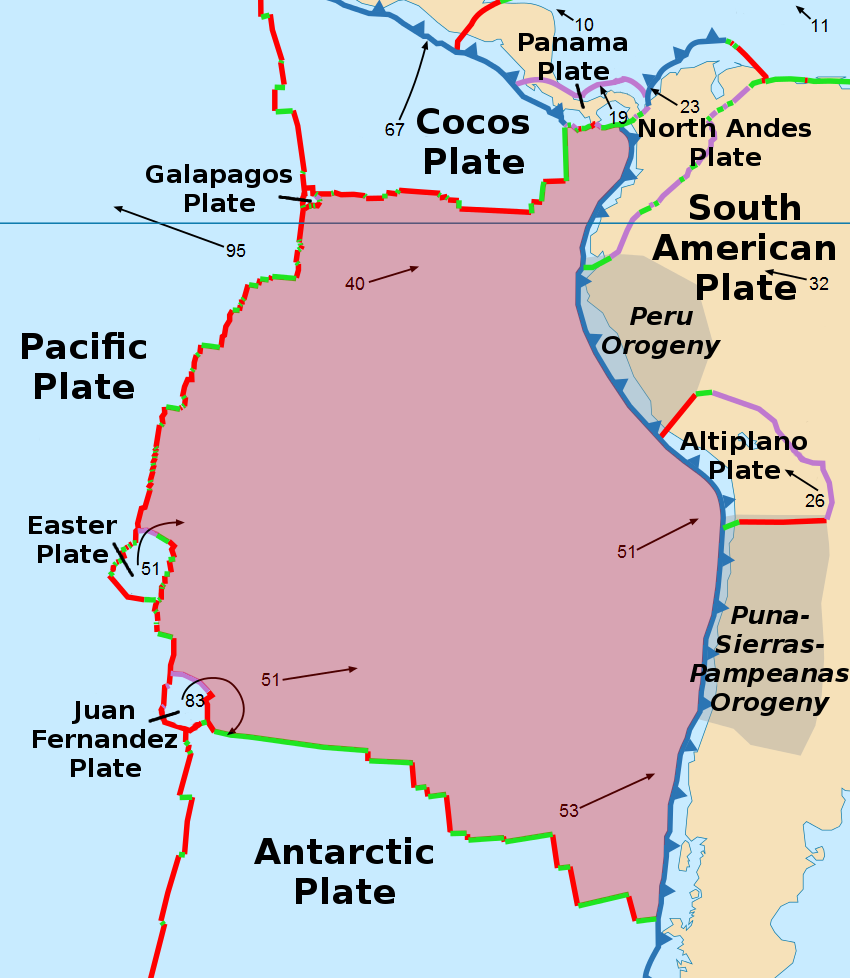
- Type: Minor
- Approximate area: 15,600,000 km^{2} (6,000,000 sq mi)
- Movement^{1}: north-east
- Speed^{1}: 40-52 mm/year
- Features: Pacific Ocean
- ^{1}Relative to the African plate

The Nazca plate or Nasca plate, named after the Nazca region of southern Peru, is an oceanic tectonic plate in the eastern Pacific Ocean basin off the west coast of South America. The ongoing subduction, along the Peru–Chile Trench, of the Nazca plate under the South American plate is largely responsible for the Andean orogeny. The Nazca plate is bounded on the west by the Pacific plate and to the south by the Antarctic plate through the East Pacific Rise and the Chile Rise, respectively. The movement of the Nazca plate over several hotspots has created some volcanic islands as well as east–west running seamount chains that subduct under South America. Nazca is a relatively young plate in terms of the age of its rocks and its existence as an independent plate, having been formed from the breakup of the Farallon plate about 23 million years ago. The oldest rocks of the plate are about 50 million years old.

== Boundaries ==
=== East Pacific and Chile Rise ===
A triple junction, the Chile triple junction, occurs on the seafloor of the Pacific Ocean off Taitao and Tres Montes Peninsula at the southern coast of Chile. Here, three tectonic plates meet: the Nazca plate, the South American plate, and the Antarctic plate.

=== Peru–Chile Trench ===
The eastern margin is a convergent boundary subduction zone under the South American plate and the Andes Mountains, forming the Peru–Chile Trench. The southern side is a divergent boundary with the Antarctic plate, the Chile Rise, where seafloor spreading permits magma to rise. The western side is a divergent boundary with the Pacific plate, forming the East Pacific Rise. The northern side is a divergent boundary with the Cocos plate, the Cocos–Nazca spreading centre.

The subduction of the Nazca plate under southern Chile has a history of producing massive earthquakes, including the largest ever recorded on earth, the moment magnitude 9.5 1960 Valdivia earthquake.

== Intraplate features ==
=== Hotspots ===
A second triple junction occurs at the northwest corner of the plate where the Nazca, Cocos, and Pacific plates all join off the coast of Colombia. Yet another triple junction occurs at the southwest corner at the intersection of the Nazca, Pacific, and Antarctic plates off the coast of southern Chile. At each of these triple junctions an anomalous microplate exists, the Galapagos microplate at the northern junction and the Juan Fernandez microplate at the southern junction. The Easter Island microplate is a third microplate that is located just north of the Juan Fernandez Microplate and lies just west of Easter Island.

=== Aseismic ridges ===
The Carnegie Ridge is a 1,350-kilometre-long (840 mi) and up to 300-kilometre-wide (190 mi) feature on the ocean floor of the northern Nazca plate that includes the Galápagos archipelago at its western end. It is being subducted under South America with the rest of the Nazca plate.

== Plate motion ==
The absolute motion of the Nazca plate has been calibrated at 3.7 cm/year (1.5 in/year) east motion (88°), one of the fastest absolute motions of any tectonic plate. The subducting Nazca plate, which exhibits unusual flat slab subduction, is tearing as well as deforming as it is subducted (Barzangi and Isacks). The subduction has formed and continues to form the volcanic Andes Mountain Range. Deformation of the Nazca plate even affects the geography of Bolivia, far to the east (Tinker et al.). The 1994 Bolivia earthquake occurred on the Nazca plate; this had a magnitude of 8.2 $M_w$, which at that time was the strongest instrumentally recorded earthquake occurring deeper than 300 km (190 mi).

Aside from the Juan Fernández Islands, this area has very few other islands that are affected by the earthquakes resulting from complicated movements at these junctions.

== Geologic history ==
The precursor of the Nazca plate, Juan de Fuca plate, and the Cocos plate was the Farallon plate, which split in the late Oligocene, about 22.8 Mya, a date arrived at by interpreting magnetic anomalies. Subduction under the South American continent began about 140 Mya, although the formation of the high parts of the Central Andes and the Bolivian orocline did not occur until 45 Mya. It has been suggested that the mountains were forced up by the subduction of the older and heavier parts of the plate, which sank more quickly into the mantle.

== See also ==
- 2010 Chile earthquake
- 2026 Huancayo earthquake
- 2026 Colombia earthquake
- Caribbean plate
- Galápagos Rise – fossil spreading centre active 17–5.8 million years ago
