= Mocha-Villarrica Fault Zone =

Geological fault zone in Chile and Argentina

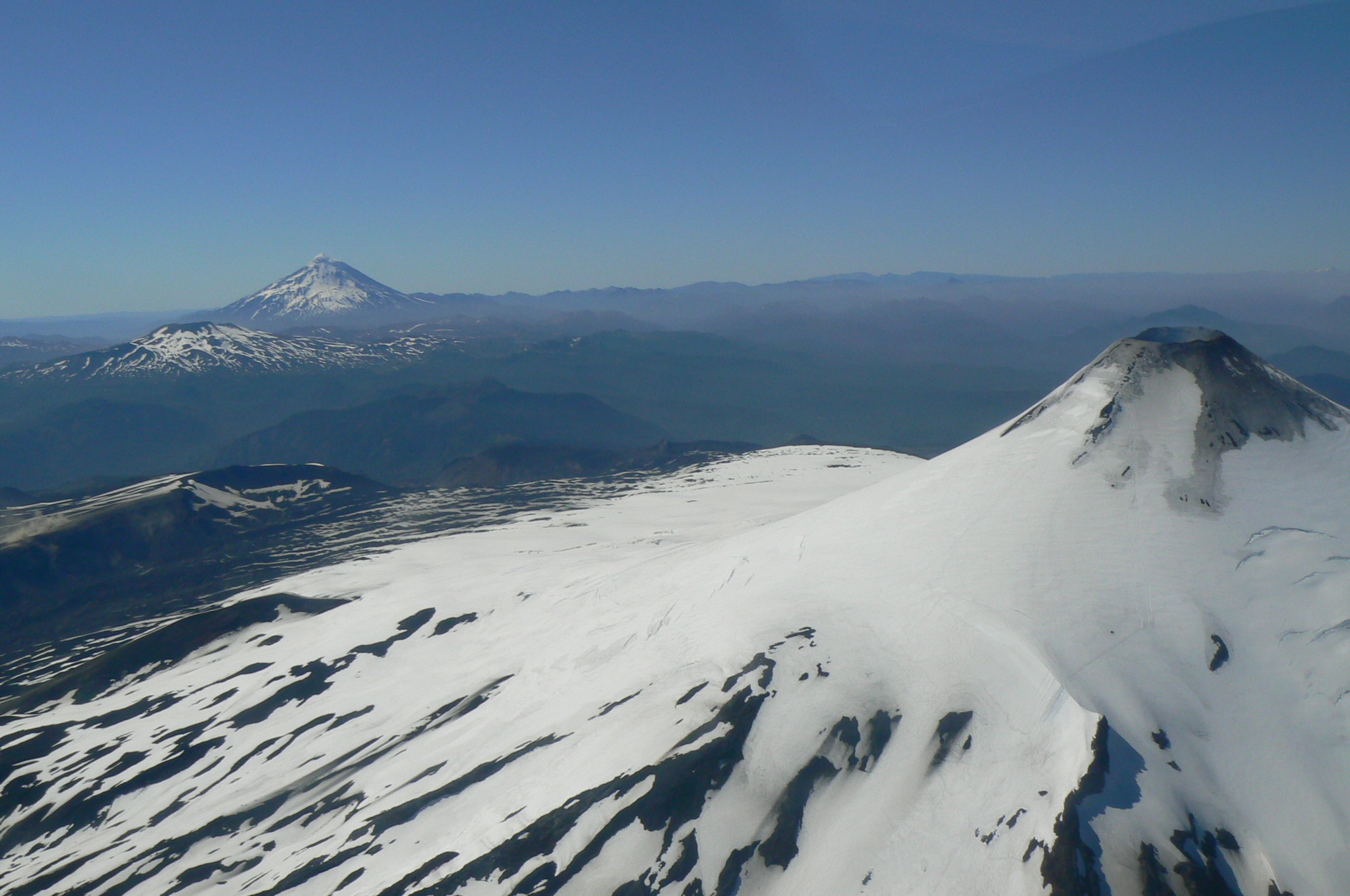
Aerial view of the volcanic alignment of Villarrica (closest), Quetrupillán and Lanín (farthest).

The Mocha-Villarrica Fault Zone is a northwest-trending geological fault zone in southern Chile and Argentina. The fault zone runs from Mocha Island in the Pacific to the Andes where it aligns Villarrica, Quetrupillán and Lanín volcanoes. It is one of several fault zones that traverses the north-south Liquiñe-Ofqui Fault.
