= Taitao ophiolite =

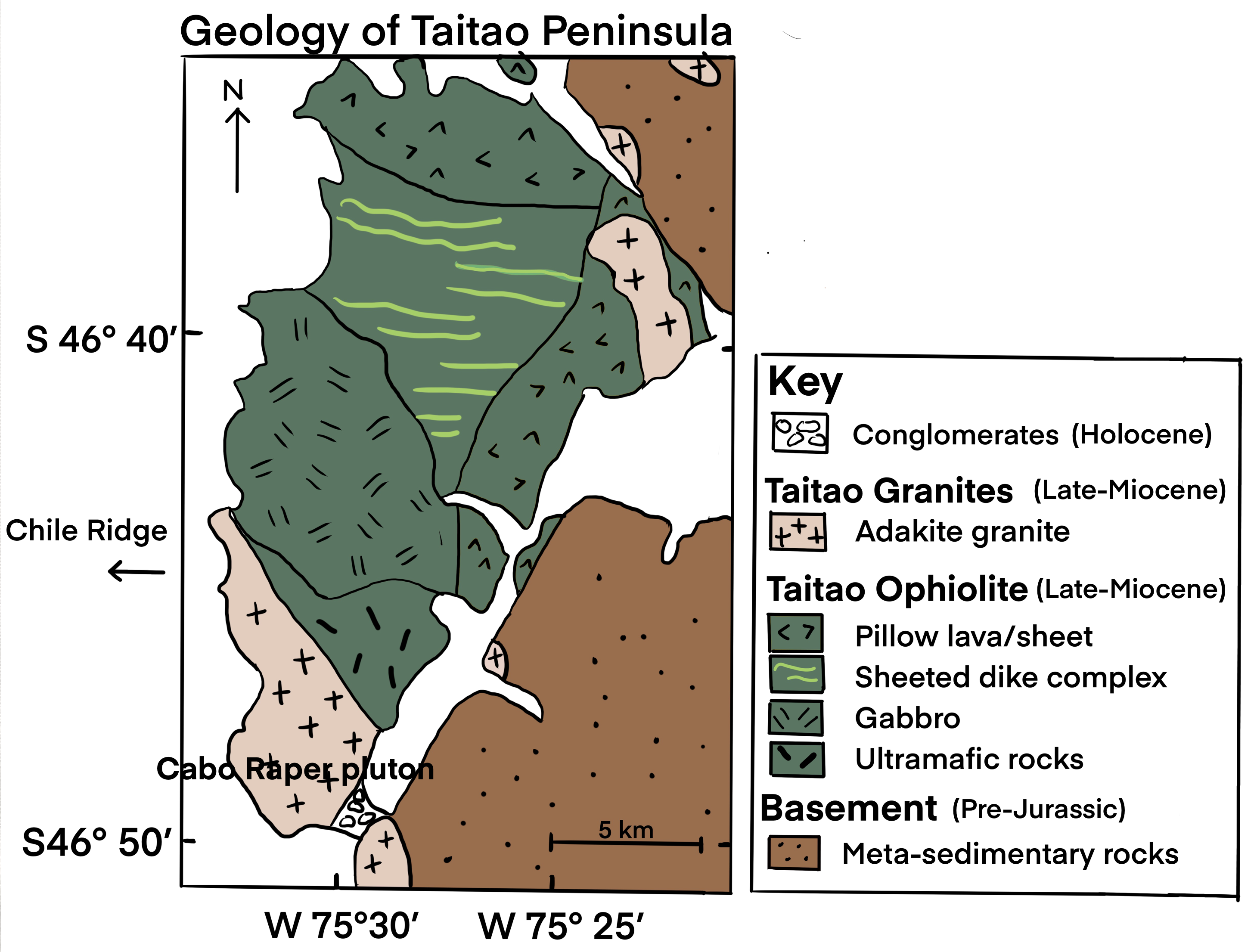
Map of the geology of western Taitao Peninsula. Taitao granites and Taitao ophiolites would be mainly focused on in this part. Chile ridge is located west of the Taitao Peninsula, and the geology of Chile Ridge is closely associated with that of Taitao Peninsula.

Taitao ophiolite (Spanish: Ofiolita de Taitao) is an ophiolite in Taitao Peninsula of western Patagonia, Chile. The ophiolite crops out about 10 km w to the east of the Peru-Chile Trench and 50 km to the south of Chile Triple Junction —two features to which it is related.

The ophiolite formed in connection to the subduction of the Chile Rise, a mid-ocean ridge, beneath South America. More specifically it has been proposed that the ophiolite formed in a rift of the forearc region of the South American plate.

The Taitao ophiolite presents a pseudostratigraphy with the following lithologies; peridotite, pyroxenite, gabbro, sheeted dykes of diabase, pillow lava and sedimentary rock.
