= Liquiñe-Ofqui Fault =

Major geological fault in Northern Chile

- Falla de Liquiñe-Ofqui
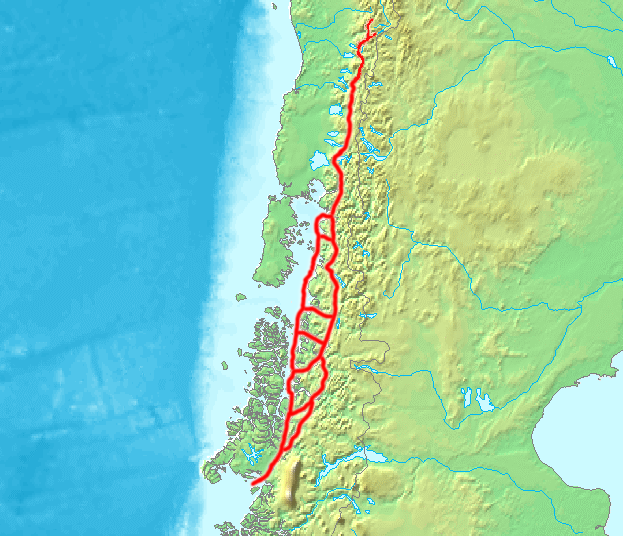
- Approximate extent of the Liquiñe-Ofqui Fault shown in red. Note that it is near parallel to the Peru-Chile Trench, the coastline, the Chilean Coast Range and the Andes
- Etymology: Liquiñe, Ofqui
- Named by: Hervé et al.
- Year defined: 1979
- Country: Chile

Characteristics
- Range: Andes
- Length: 1,200 km (750 mi)

Tectonics
- Plate: South American
- Status: Active
- Earthquakes: 1960 Valdivia earthquake aftershock, 2007 Aysén Fjord earthquakes
- Type: Intra-arc strike-slip fault
- Movement: Dextral
- Orogeny: Andean
- Volcanic arc/belt: Southern Volcanic Zone

The Liquiñe-Ofqui Fault is a major geological fault that runs a length of roughly 1,200 kilometres (750 mi) in a NNE-SSW orientation and exhibits current seismicity. It is located in the Chilean Northern Patagonian Andes. It is a dextral intra-arc strike-slip fault. Most large stratovolcanoes of the Southern Volcanic Zone of the Andes are aligned by the fault which allows for the movement of magma and hydrothermal fluids.

The fault crosses several transverse faults including the Mocha-Villarrica Fault Zone (MVFZ) and the Biobío-Aluminé Fault Zone. The fault has had periods of ductile deformation associated to pluton emplacement, be it either at great depths or by shallow intrusions.

The forces that move the fault are derivative of the oblique subduction offshore Chile's coast. This leads to partition of deformation between the subduction zone, the fore-arc and the intra-arc region where the fault lies. There is evidence that the fault broke as a moment magnitude 9.07 subevent in the 1960 Valdivia earthquake. A portion of the fault in Aysén Region likely slipped (moved) in an aftershock a few weeks after the 1960 Valdivia earthquake. This same portion slipped again in April 2007, causing earthquakes in Aysén Fjord, triggering landslides and a local tsunami.

The fault name was coined by Francisco Hervé, I. Fuenzalida, E. Araya and A. Solano in 1979. The existence of the fault was first inferred by Chilean government agent Hans Steffen around 1900, who referred to it as a "tectonic furrow" (Spanish: surco tectónico).

== See also ==
- Chile triple junction
