= Antarctic plate =

Major tectonic plate containing Antarctica and the surrounding ocean floor

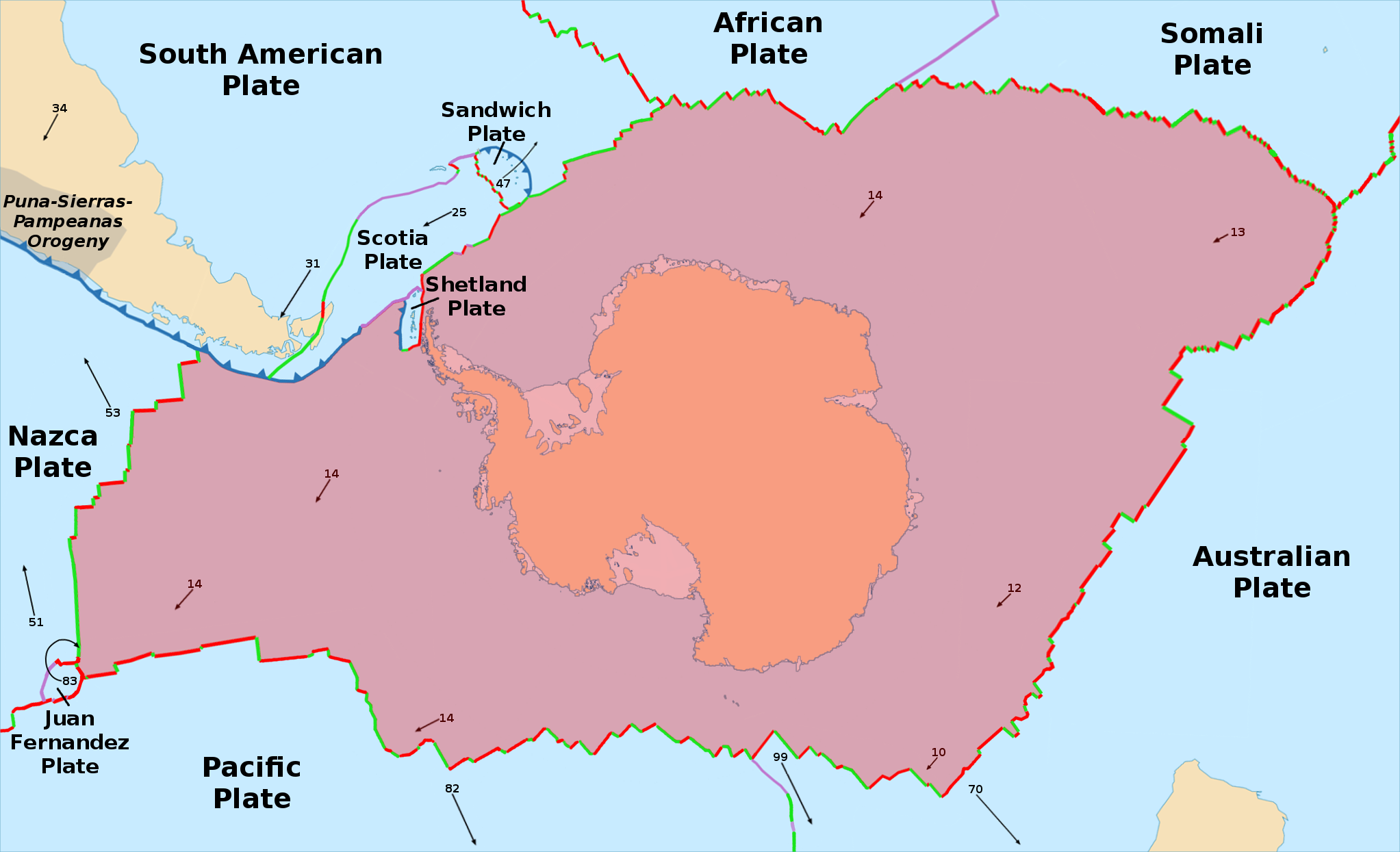
- Type: Major
- Approximate area: 60,900,000 km^{2} (23,500,000 sq mi)
- Movement^{1}: South-west
- Speed^{1}: 12–14 mm (0.47–0.55 in)/year
- Features: Antarctica, Kerguelen Plateau, Southern Ocean
- ^{1}Relative to the African plate

The Antarctic plate is a tectonic plate containing the continent of Antarctica, the Kerguelen Plateau, and some remote islands in the Southern Ocean and other surrounding oceans. After breakup from Gondwana (the southern part of the supercontinent Pangea), the Antarctic plate began moving the continent of Antarctica south to its present isolated location, causing the continent to develop a much colder climate. The Antarctic plate is bounded almost entirely by extensional mid-ocean ridge systems. The adjoining plates are the Nazca plate, the South American plate, the African plate, the Somali plate, the Indo-Australian plate, the Pacific plate, and, across a transform boundary, the Scotia and South Sandwich plates.

The Antarctic plate has an area of about 60,900,000 km^{2} (23,500,000 sq mi). It is Earth's fifth-largest tectonic plate.

The Antarctic plate's movement is estimated to be at least 1 cm (0.4 in) per year, roughly toward the Atlantic Ocean. The continent is also splitting apart at around 1–2 mm (0.04–0.08 in) per year along the West Antarctic Rift System, which is responsible for the Transantarctic Mountains and all the recent volcanism in Antarctica.

== Subduction beneath South America ==
The Antarctic plate started to subduct beneath South America 14 million years ago in the Miocene epoch. At first it subducted only in the southernmost tip of Patagonia, meaning that the Chile triple junction lay near the Strait of Magellan. As the southern part of the Nazca plate and the Chile Rise became consumed by subduction the more northerly regions of the Antarctic plate began to subduct beneath Patagonia so that the Chile triple junction lies at present in front of Taitao Peninsula at 46°15' S. The subduction of the Antarctic plate beneath South America is held to have uplifted Patagonia as it reduced the previously vigorous down-dragging flow in the Earth's mantle caused by the subduction of the Nazca plate beneath Patagonia. The dynamic topography caused by this uplift raised Quaternary-aged marine terraces and beaches across the Atlantic coast of Patagonia.

== Land ==
- Amsterdam Island (France)
- Antarctica
  - East Antarctica
  - Transantarctic Mountains
  - West Antarctica
    - Antarctic Peninsula
- Crozet Islands (France)
- Heard Island and McDonald Islands (Australia)
  - Heard Island
  - McDonald Islands
- Kerguelen Islands (France)
- Peter I Island
- Prince Edward Islands (South Africa)
- Saint Paul Island (France)
- South Orkney Islands
- South Shetland Islands
