= South American plate =

Major tectonic plate

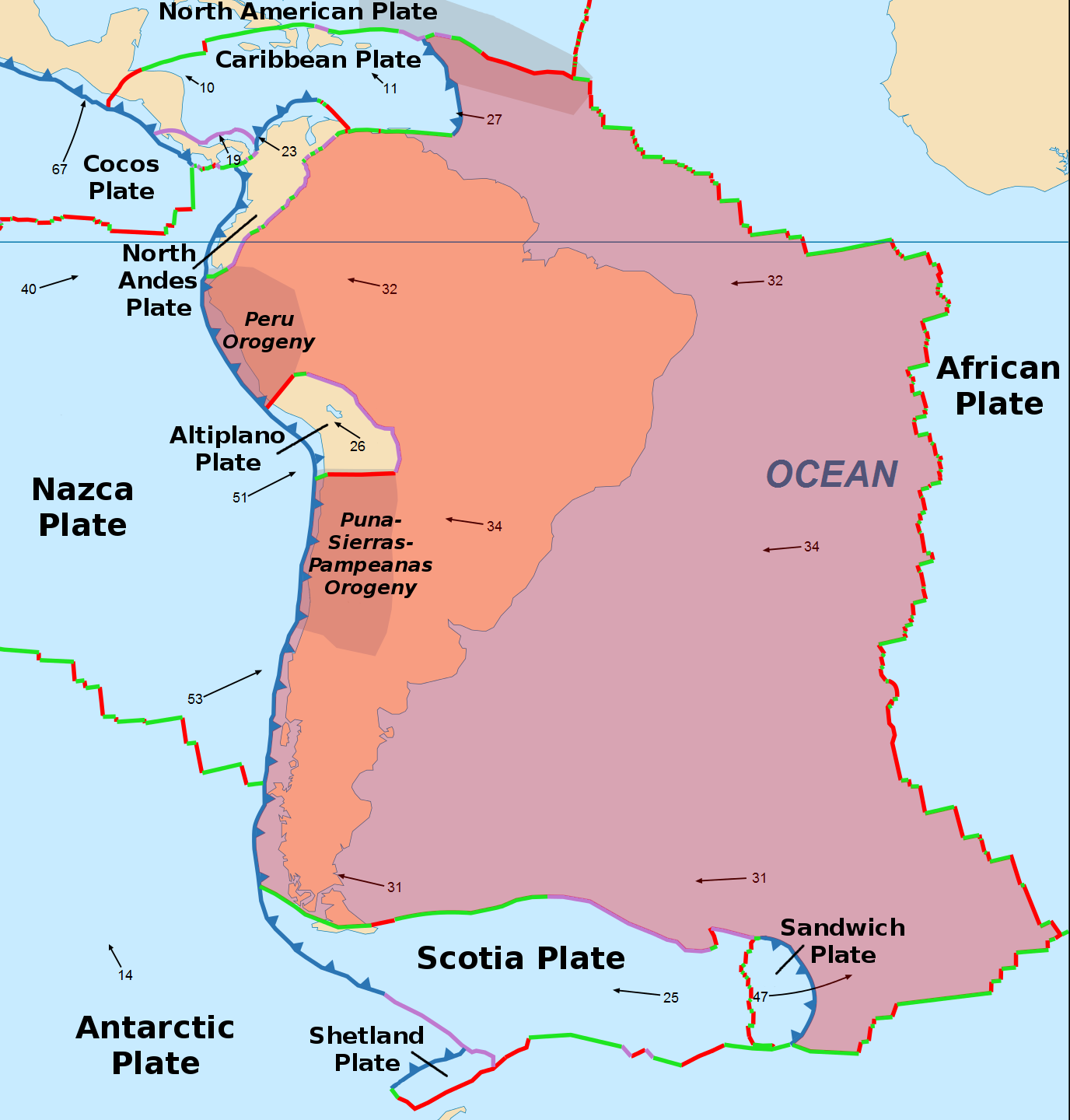
- Type: Major
- Approximate area: 43,600,000 km^{2} (16,800,000 sq mi)
- Movement^{1}: West
- Speed^{1}: 27–34 mm (1.1–1.3 in)/year
- Features: South America, Atlantic Ocean
- ^{1}Relative to the African plate

The South American plate is a major tectonic plate which includes the continent of South America as well as a sizable region of the Atlantic Ocean seabed extending eastward to the African plate, with which it forms the southern part of the Mid-Atlantic Ridge.

The easterly edge is a divergent boundary with the African plate; the southerly edge is a complex boundary with the Antarctic plate, the Scotia plate, and the Sandwich Plate; the westerly edge is a convergent boundary with the subducting Nazca plate; and the northerly edge is a boundary with the Caribbean plate and the oceanic crust of the North American plate. At the Chile triple junction, near the west coast of the Taitao–Tres Montes Peninsula, an oceanic ridge known as the Chile Rise is actively subducting under the South American plate.

Geological research suggests that the South American plate is moving west away from the Mid-Atlantic Ridge: "Parts of the plate boundaries consisting of alternations of relatively short transform fault and spreading ridge segments are represented by a boundary following the general trend." As a result, the eastward-moving and more dense Nazca plate is subducting under the western edge of the South American plate, along the continent's Pacific coast, at a rate of 77 mm (3.0 in) per year. The collision of these two plates is responsible for lifting the massive Andes Mountains and for creating the numerous volcanoes (including both stratovolcanoes and shield volcanoes) that are strewn throughout the Andes.

== See also ==
- Fifteen-Twenty fracture zone
