= Shetland plate =

Tectonic microplate off the tip of the Antarctic Peninsula

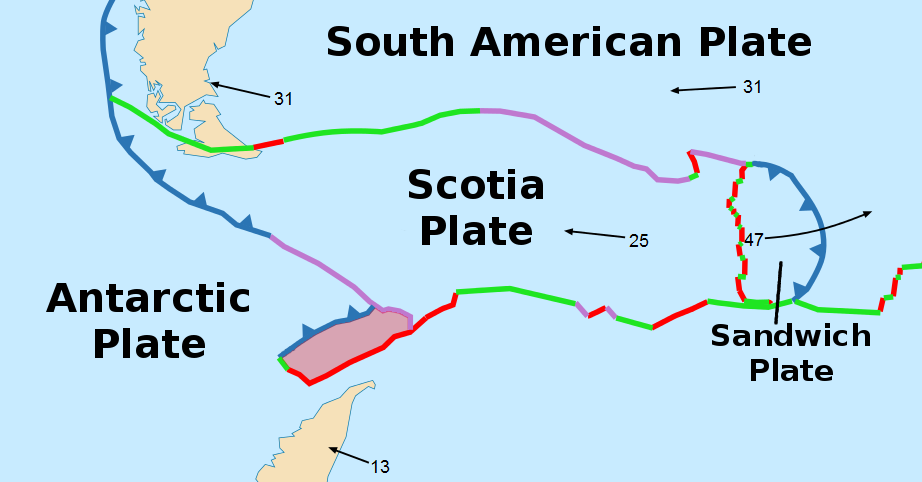
- Shetland plate shaded in red.
- Type: Minor
- Coordinates: 62°10′S 61°00′W
- Movement^{1}: Northwest
- Speed^{1}: 1 to 2 cm (0.39 to 0.79 in)/yr
- Features: South Shetland Islands, Southern Ocean
- ^{1}Relative to the African plate

The Shetland plate, or South Shetland plate, is a tectonic microplate located off the tip of the Antarctic Peninsula that contains the South Shetland Islands. The plate is bordered on three sides by the Antarctic plate, while the fourth side is bordered by the Scotia plate. The northwestern border is defined by the South Shetland Trench, separating the Shetland plate to the south from the Antarctic plate to the north. This trench is the remnant of a subduction zone where the defunct Phoenix plate, now part of the Antarctic plate, subducted under the Antarctic Peninsula and the Shetland Islands. The southeastern border is a rift zone, with the Antarctic plate creating the Bransfield Basin. The southwestern and northeastern boundaries are each part of larger fracture zones. The southwestern border is the Hero fracture zone and separates the Antarctic plate to the southwest from the Shetland plate to the northeast. The northeastern boundary is the Shackleton fracture zone and separates the Shetland plate to the southwest from the Scotia plate.

== Geologic history ==
The Shetland plate started forming 3 to 4 million years ago. Prior to formation, the Shetland plate was part of the Antarctic plate adjacent to the Antarctic Peninsula. During this period, the Phoenix plate to the northwest, was subducting under the Antarctic Peninsula and the South Shetland Islands, which created the South Shetland Trench. Approximately 3 million years ago spreading stopped at the Antarctic-Phoenix spreading center in Drake Passage. The Phoenix plate is now considered part of the larger Antarctic plate due to a lack of relative movement between the two since spreading ceased. However, subduction in the South Shetland Trench did not cease. Slab rollback of the former Phoenix plate underneath the South Shetland Islands caused rifting to develop in the Antarctic Peninsula creating the Shetland plate and the Bransfield Basin. Rifting centers in the Bransfield Basin continue to separate the Shetland plate from the Antarctic Peninsula.

== Tectonic setting ==
=== South Shetland Trench ===
The South Shetland Trench forms the northwest border of the Shetland plate. The trench is formed by the subduction of the Antarctic plate in the north under the Shetland plate in the south. Subduction along this trench has slowed significantly over time, from 4 to 6 centimetres (1.6 to 2.4 in) per year over the last 30 million years to 1 to 2 centimetres (0.39 to 0.79 in) per year in the last 6 million years. Current subduction is caused by the movement of the Shetland plate northward, as well as, slab rollback of the former Phoenix plate.

=== Bransfield Basin ===
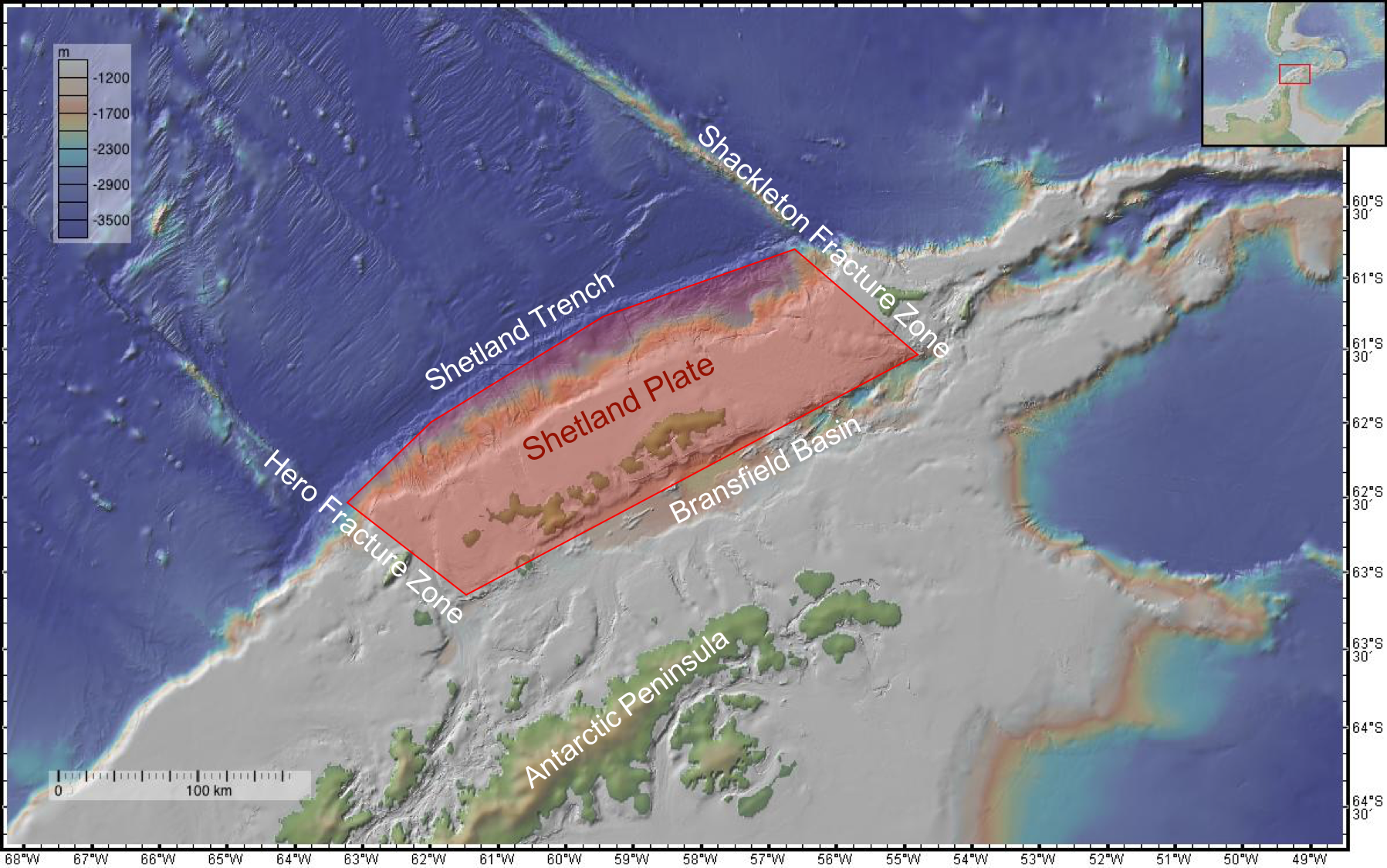
Boundaries and bathymetry of the Shetland plate.

The Bransfield Basin forms the southeast border of the Shetland plate. The basin separates the Shetland plate on the north and the Antarctic plate to the south. The basin is a back-arc rift basin. The basin ranges from 1,300 metres (4,300 ft) to more than 2,700 metres (8,900 ft) deep.

=== Fracture zones ===
The Shackleton fracture zone is the northeast border of the Shetland plate. The fracture zone is a series of parallel transform faults separating the Scotia plate from the Shetland plate. This border with the Scotia plate is the only Shetland plate boundary that is not with the Antarctic plate.

The Hero fracture zone is the southwest boundary of the Shetland plate. This feature separates the Shetland plate from the Antarctic plate. These parallel faults connect the Bransfield Basin in the south to the South Shetland Trench in the north.

== Volcanism ==
Absolute K–Ar ages indicate volcanism has been active from the Cenozoic to the present. Current volcanism can be seen at Deception Island and Penguin Island. Plutons of calc-alkaline compositions, formed from a type of magma created above subduction zones, date from the Cenozoic to the Miocene and is coincident with the active subduction of the Phoenix plate under Antarctica. More recent Pliocene dated volcanism in the Bransfield basin has transitional chemistry between subduction zone calc-alkaline and mid ocean ridge tholeiitic magmas. The transitional chemistry can be explained by back-arc rifting in the Bransfield Basin.

== Earthquakes ==
Since the early 1980s, earthquakes have been recorded in the Shetland plate. The amount of data has been limited by remoteness, severe weather, and a lack of permanent seismic stations in the area. Intermediate depth earthquakes (35–55 km) under the South Shetland Islands indicate that subduction is still occurring at the Shetland Trench.
