= List of tectonic plates =

Map of Earth's 16 principal tectonic plates. Types of plate boundary: Convergent Collision zone Subduction zone Divergent Extension zone Spreading center Transform Dextral transform Sinistral transform

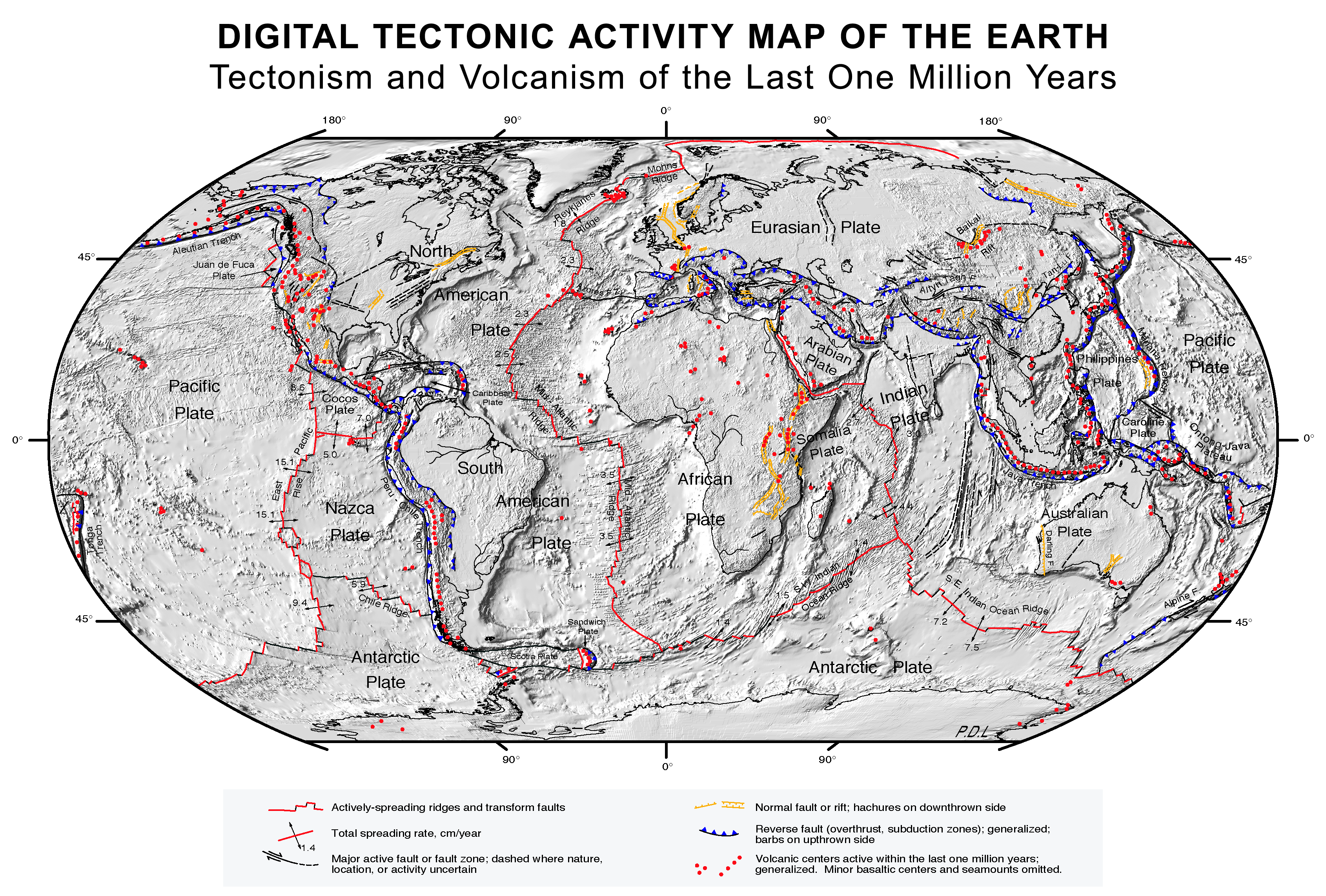
Plate tectonics map from NASA

This is a list of tectonic plates on Earth's surface. Tectonic plates are pieces of Earth's crust and uppermost mantle, together referred to as the lithosphere. The plates are around 100 km (62 mi) thick and consist of two principal types of material: oceanic crust (also called sima from silicon and magnesium) and continental crust (sial from silicon and aluminium). The composition of the two types of crust differs markedly, with mafic basaltic rocks dominating oceanic crust, while continental crust consists principally of lower-density felsic granitic rocks.

== Current plates ==
Geologists generally agree that the following tectonic plates currently exist on Earth's surface with roughly definable boundaries. Tectonic plates are sometimes subdivided into three fairly arbitrary categories: major (or primary) plates, minor (or secondary) plates, and microplates (or tertiary plates).

=== Major plates ===
Map showing Earth's principal tectonic plates and their boundaries in detail

These plates comprise the bulk of the continents and the Pacific Ocean. For purposes of this list, a major plate is any plate with an area greater than 20 million km^{2} (7.7 million sq mi).

- African plate – Tectonic plate underlying Africa – 61,300,000 km^{2} (23,700,000 sq mi)
- Antarctic plate – Major tectonic plate containing Antarctica and the surrounding ocean floor – 60,900,000 km^{2} (23,500,000 sq mi)
- Eurasian plate – Tectonic plate which includes most of Eurasia – 67,800,000 km^{2} (26,200,000 sq mi)
- Indo-Australian plate – Major tectonic plate formed by the fusion of the Indian and Australian plates (sometimes considered to be two separate tectonic plates) – 58,900,000 km^{2} (22,700,000 sq mi)
  - Australian plate – Major tectonic plate – 47,000,000 km^{2} (18,000,000 sq mi)
- North American plate – Large tectonic plate including most of North America, Greenland and part of Siberia – 75,900,000 km^{2} (29,300,000 sq mi)
- Pacific plate – Oceanic tectonic plate under the Pacific Ocean – 103,300,000 km^{2} (39,900,000 sq mi)
- South American plate – Major tectonic plate – 43,600,000 km^{2} (16,800,000 sq mi)

=== Minor plates ===
These smaller plates are often not shown on major plate maps, as the majority of them do not comprise significant land area. For purposes of this list, a minor plate is any plate with an area less than 20 million km^{2} (7.7 million sq mi) but greater than 1 million km^{2} (0.39 million sq mi).

- Amur plate – Minor tectonic plate in eastern Asia
- Arabian plate – Minor tectonic plate – 5,000,000 km^{2} (1,900,000 sq mi)
- Burma plate – Minor tectonic plate in Southeast Asia – 1,100,000 km^{2} (420,000 sq mi)
- Caribbean plate – Tectonic plate in Central America and the Caribbean – 3,300,000 km^{2} (1,300,000 sq mi)
- Caroline plate – Minor oceanic tectonic plate north of New Guinea – 1,700,000 km^{2} (660,000 sq mi)
- Cocos plate – Tectonic plate beneath the Pacific Ocean – 2,900,000 km^{2} (1,100,000 sq mi)
- Indian plate – Minor plate that separated from Gondwana – 11,900,000 km^{2} (4,600,000 sq mi)
- Nazca plate – Oceanic tectonic plate in the eastern Pacific Ocean basin – 15,600,000 km^{2} (6,000,000 sq mi) (Note: 15,600,000 km^{2} is the original size before the 2017 split of the Coiba and Malpelo plates.)
- New Hebrides plate – Minor Pacific Ocean tectonic plate – 1,100,000 km^{2} (420,000 sq mi)
- Okhotsk microplate – Minor tectonic plate in Asia
- Philippine Sea plate – Oceanic tectonic plate to the east of the Philippines – 5,500,000 km^{2} (2,100,000 sq mi)
- Scotia plate – Minor oceanic tectonic plate between the Antarctic and South American plates – 1,600,000 km^{2} (620,000 sq mi)
- Somali plate – Minor tectonic plate including the east coast of Africa and the adjoining seabed – 16,700,000 km^{2} (6,400,000 sq mi)
- Sunda plate – Tectonic plate including Southeast Asia
- Yangtze plate – Tectonic plate carrying the bulk of southern China

=== Microplates ===
These plates are often grouped with an adjacent principal plate on a tectonic plate world map. For purposes of this list, a microplate is any plate with an area less than 1,000,000 km^{2} (390,000 mi^{2}). Some models identify more minor plates within current orogens (events that lead to a large structural deformation of Earth's lithosphere) like the Apulian, Explorer, Gorda, and Philippine Mobile Belt plates. The latest studies have shown that microplates are the basic elements of which the crust is composed and that the larger plates are composed of amalgamations of these, and a subdivision of ca. 1200 smaller plates has come forward.

The new Global Tectonic Map with the subdivision of the continents, oceans and mobile mountain belts in ca. 1200 smaller plates. Legend: green: terrane (microplate) boundaries in the continental blocks; cyan: terranes of the oceanic plates; orange: terranes inside the mobile belts; blue: oceanic transform faults; red: fault zones in the continental and mountain belt domain; purple: main subduction zones and suture zones; orange dots: volcanoes.

- African plate
  - Lwandle plate – Mainly oceanic tectonic microplate off the southeast coast of Africa
  - Rovuma plate – Tectonic microplate in Africa
  - Victoria microplate – Tectonic plate in East Africa
  - Danakil microplate - a microplate at the Afar triple junction
- Antarctic plate
  - East Antarctic plate
  - Shetland plate – Tectonic microplate off the tip of the Antarctic Peninsula
  - West Antarctic plate
- Australian plate
  - Capricorn plate – Proposed minor tectonic plate under the Indian Ocean
  - Futuna plate – Very small tectonic plate near the south Pacific island of Futuna
  - Kermadec plate – Tectonic plate in the south Pacific Ocean
  - Macquarie plate
  - Maoke plate – Small tectonic plate in western New Guinea
  - Niuafo'ou plate – Small tectonic plate west of Tonga
  - Tonga plate – Small tectonic plate in the southwest Pacific Ocean
  - Woodlark plate – Small tectonic plate located to the east of the island of New Guinea
- Caribbean plate
  - Gonâve microplate – Part of the boundary between the North American plate and the Caribbean plate
  - Hispaniola microplate
  - North Hispaniola microplate
  - Panama plate – Small tectonic plate in Central America
  - Puerto Rico-Virgin Islands microplate – Part of the boundary between the North American Plate and the Caribbean Plate
  - South Jamaica microplate
- Cocos plate
  - Rivera plate – Small tectonic plate off the west coast of Mexico
- Eurasian plate
  - Adriatic plate, also known as the Apulian plate – Small tectonic plate in the Mediterranean
  - Aegean Sea plate, also known as Hellenic plate – Small tectonic plate in the eastern Mediterranean Sea
  - Anatolian plate – Continental tectonic plate comprising most of the Anatolian Peninsula (Asia Minor)
  - Azores microplate – Oceanic plateau in the North Atlantic Ocean
  - Banda Sea plate – Minor tectonic plate underlying the Banda Sea in southeast Asia
  - Hreppar microplate – Small tectonic plate in south Iceland, between the Eurasian plate and the North American plate
  - Iberian plate – Small tectonic plate now part of the Eurasian plate
  - Iranian plate – Geological feature in Asia
  - Molucca Sea plate – Small fully subducted tectonic plate near Indonesia
    - Halmahera plate – Small tectonic plate in the Molucca Sea
    - Sangihe plate – Microplate within eastern Indonesia
  - Okinawa plate – Minor tectonic plate from the northern end of Taiwan to the southern tip of Kyūshū
  - Pelso plate – Small tectonic unit in the Pannonian Basin in Europe
  - Timor plate – Microplate in Southeast Asia carrying the island of Timor and surrounding islands
  - Tisza plate – Tectonic microplate, in present-day Europe
- Nazca plate
  - Coiba plate – Tectonic plate off the coast south of Panama and northwestern Colombia
  - Malpelo plate – Small tectonic plate off the coasts of Ecuador and Colombia
- North American plate
  - Greenland plate – Supposed tectonic microplate containing the Greenland craton
  - Queen Elizabeth Islands Subplate – Small tectonic plate containing the Queen Elizabeth Islands of Northern Canada
- Pacific plate
  - Balmoral Reef plate – Small tectonic plate in the south Pacific north of Fiji
  - Bird's Head plate – Small tectonic plate in New Guinea
  - Conway Reef plate – Small tectonic plate in the south Pacific west of Fiji
  - Easter microplate – Very small tectonic plate to the west of Easter Island
  - Galápagos microplate – Very small tectonic plate at the Galápagos triple junction
  - Juan de Fuca plate – Small tectonic plate in the eastern North Pacific – 250,000 km^{2}
    - Explorer plate – Northeast Pacific tectonic plate
    - Gorda plate – One of the northern remnants of the Farallon plate
  - Juan Fernández plate – Very small tectonic plate in the southern Pacific Ocean
  - Manus plate – Tiny tectonic plate northeast of New Guinea
  - North Bismarck plate – Small tectonic plate in the Bismarck Sea north of New Guinea
  - North Galápagos microplate – Very small tectonic plate at the Galápagos triple junction
  - Solomon Sea plate – Minor tectonic plate near the Solomon Islands archipelago in the Pacific Ocean
  - South Bismarck plate – Small tectonic plate in the southern Bismarck Sea
  - Trobriand plate – Small tectonic plate located to the east of the island of New Guinea
- Philippine Sea plate
  - Mariana plate – Small tectonic plate west of the Mariana Trench
  - Philippine Mobile Belt, also known as Philippine microplate – Tectonic boundary
- Scotia plate
  - South Sandwich plate – Small tectonic plate south of the South American plate
- Somali plate
  - Madagascar plate – Tectonic plate formerly part of the supercontinent Gondwana
- South American plate
  - Altiplano plate
  - Falklands microplate
  - North Andes plate – Small tectonic plate in South America (mainly in Colombia, minor parts in Ecuador and Venezuela)

== Ancient tectonic plates ==
In the history of Earth, many tectonic plates have come into existence and have over the intervening years either accreted onto other plates to form larger plates, rifted into smaller plates, or have been crushed by or subducted under other plates.

The following is a list of ancient cratons, microplates, plates, and terranes which no longer exist as separate plates. Cratons are the oldest and most stable parts of the continental lithosphere, and shields are exposed parts of them. Terranes are fragments of crustal material formed on one tectonic plate and accreted to crust lying on another plate, which may or may not have originated as independent microplates: a terrane may not contain the full thickness of the lithosphere.

=== African plate ===
- Atlantica – Ancient continent formed during the Proterozoic about 2 billion years ago
- Bangweulu Block – Part of the Congo craton of central Africa (Zambia)
- Congo Craton – Precambrian craton that with four others makes up the modern continent of Africa (Angola, Cameroon, Central African Republic, Democratic Republic of Congo, Gabon, Sudan, and Zambia)
- Kaapvaal Craton – Archaean craton, possibly part of the Vaalbara supercontinent (South Africa)
- Kalahari Craton – African geological area (South Africa)
- Saharan Metacraton – Large area of continental crust in the north-central part of Africa (Algeria)
- Sebakwe proto-Craton – Old and stable part of the continental lithosphere (Zimbabwe)
- Tanzania Craton – Old and stable part of the continental lithosphere in central Tanzania (Tanzania)
- West African Craton – One of the five Precambrian cratons that make up the African Plate (Algeria, Benin, Burkina Faso, Côte d'Ivoire, Gambia, Ghana, Guinea, Guinea Bissau, Liberia, Mali, Mauritania, Morocco, Nigeria, Senegal, Sierra Leone, and Togo)
- Zaire Craton (Congo)
- Zimbabwe Craton – Area in Southern Africa of ancient continental crust (Zimbabwe)

=== Antarctic plate ===
- Bellingshausen plate – Ancient tectonic plate that fused onto the Antarctic plate
- Charcot plate – Fragment of the Phoenix tectonic plate fused to the Antarctic Peninsula
- East Antarctic Shield, also known as East Antarctic Craton – Cratonic rock body which makes up most of the continent Antarctica
- Phoenix plate – Tectonic plate that existed during the early Paleozoic through late Cenozoic time

=== Eurasian plate ===
- Armorica – Microcontinent or group of continental fragments rifted away from Gondwana (France, Germany, Spain and Portugal)
- Avalonia – Microcontinent in the Paleozoic era (Canada, Ireland, Great Britain, and United States)
- Baltic plate – Ancient tectonic plate from the Cambrian to the Carboniferous Period
- Belomorian Craton
- Central Iberian plate
- Cimmerian plate – Ancient string of microcontinents that rifted from Gondwana (Anatolia, Iran, Afghanistan, Tibet, Indochina and Malaya)
- East China Craton
- East European Craton – Geology of Europe
- Baltic Shield, also known as Fennoscandian Shield – Ancient segment of Earth's crust
- Junggar plate – Geographical subregion in Northwest China and Eastern Kazakhstan
- Hunic plate
- Karelian Craton – Region comprising the Scandinavian Peninsula, Finland, Karelia, and the Kola Peninsula
- Kazakhstania – Geological region in Central Asia and the Junngar Basin in China
- Kola Craton – Geographical peninsula in Europe
- Lhasa terrane – Fragment of crustal material that forms present-day southern Tibet
- Massif Central – Highland region in southern France
- Moldanubian plate – Tectonic zone in Europe
- Moravo Silesian plate
- Midlands Microcraton – Block of late Neoproterozoic crust which underlies the Midlands region of England
- North Atlantic Craton – Archaean craton exposed in Greenland, Labrador, and northwestern Scotland
- North China Craton – Continental crustal block in China, Inner Mongolia, the Yellow Sea, and North Korea
- Ossa-Morena plate
- Piemont-Liguria plate – Former piece of oceanic crust that is seen as part of the Tethys Ocean
- Proto-Alps terrane
- Rhenohercynian plate – Fold belt of west and central Europe, formed during the Hercynian orogeny
- Sarmatian Craton – Part of the East European Craton
- Saxothuringian plate – European tectonic zone
- Siberian Craton – Ancient craton forming the Central Siberian Plateau
- South Portuguese plate
- Tarim craton
- Teplá-Barrandian terrane
- Ukrainian Shield – The southwest shield of the East European craton
- Valais plate – Subducted ocean basin. Remnants found in the Alps in the North Penninic nappes.
- Volgo-Uralian craton
- Yakutai craton
- Yangtze Craton – Precambrian continental block located in China

=== Indo-Australian plate ===
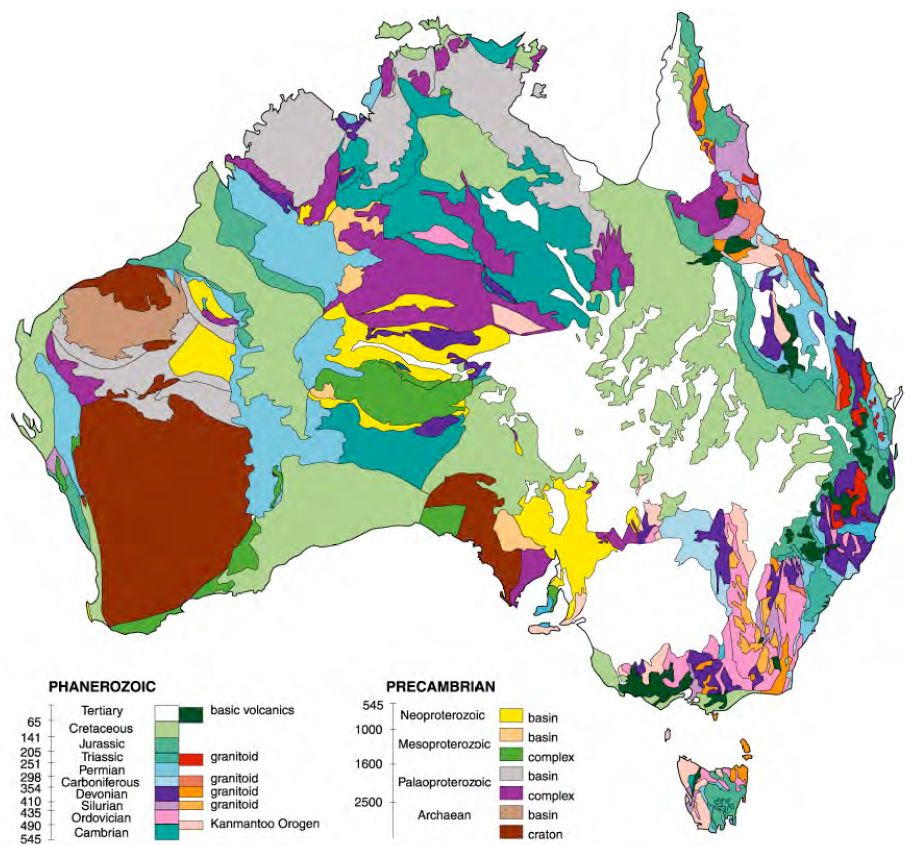
Basic geological regions of Australia, by age

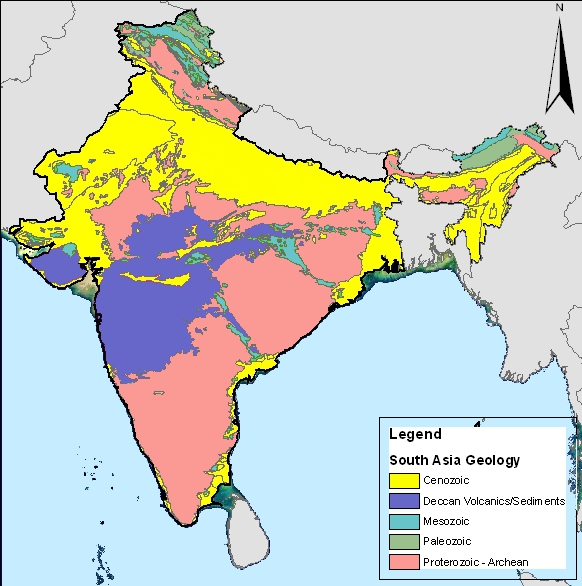
Map of chronostratigraphic divisions of India

- Altjawarra Craton (Australia)
- Aravalli Craton (India)
- Bastar Craton (India)
- Bhandara Craton (India)
- Bundelkhand Craton (India)
- Dharwar Craton – Part of the Indian Shield in south India
- Central Craton (Australia)
- Curnamona Craton (Australia)
- Gawler Craton – Province of the larger West Australian Shield in central South Australia
- Indian Craton
- Narooma terrane – Geological structural region on the south coast of New South Wales, Australia
- Pilbara Craton – Old and stable part of the continental lithosphere located in Pilbara, Western Australia
- Singhbhum Craton (India)
- Yilgarn Craton – Large craton in Western Australia
- Australian Shield, also known as Western Australian Shield – Large part of the continent of Australia
- Zealandia – Mostly submerged continental crust area in Oceania. See Moa plate and Lord Howe Rise

=== North American plate ===
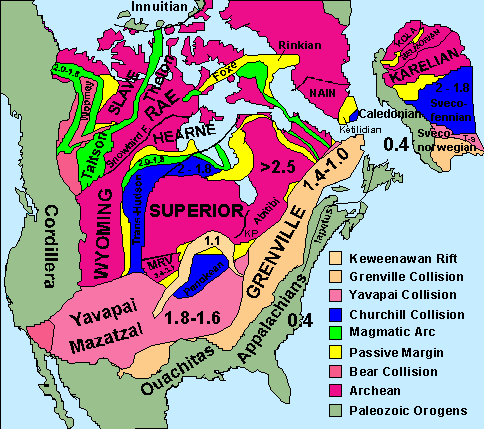
North American cratons and basement rocks

- Avalonia – Microcontinent in the Paleozoic era (Canada, Ireland, Great Britain, and United States)
- Carolina plate – Exotic terrane from central Georgia to central Virginia in the United States
- Churchill Craton – Geologic region in Canada (Canada)
- Farallon plate – Ancient oceanic plate that has mostly subducted under the North American plate (split into the Cocos, Explorer, Juan de Fuca, Gorda plates, Nazca plate, and Rivera plates)
- Hearne Craton – Craton in northern Canada (Canada)
- Laurentian Craton, also known as North American Craton – Craton forming the geological core of North America (Canada and United States)
- Insular plate – Ancient oceanic plate
- Intermontane plate – Ancient oceanic tectonic plate
- Izanagi plate – Ancient tectonic plate
- Mexican plate
- Nain Province – Part of the North Atlantic Craton in Labrador, Canada (Canada)
- Newfoundland plate
- North Atlantic Craton – Archaean craton exposed in Greenland, Labrador, and northwestern Scotland
- Nova Scotia plate
- Rae Craton – Archean craton in northern Canada north of the Superior Craton (Canada)
- Sask Craton (Canada)
- Sclavia Craton – Late Archean supercraton (Canada)
- Slave Craton – Area of ancient rocks in northwest Canada (Canada)
- Superior Craton – Large crustal block in North America (Canada)
- Wyoming Craton – Craton in the west-central United States and western Canada (United States)

=== South American plate ===
- Amazonian Craton – Geologic province in South America (Brazil)
- Guiana Shield – Precambrian geological formation in northeast South America (Brazil, Colombia, French Guiana, Guyana, Suriname and Venezuela)
- Río de la Plata Craton – Medium-sized continental block in Uruguay, eastern Argentina and southern Brazil (Argentina and Uruguay)
- São Francisco Craton – Ancient craton in eastern South America (Brazil)
- Arequipa–Antofalla Craton – South American geology (Argentina, Bolivia, Chile and Peru)

== See also ==
- Asthenosphere – Highly viscous, ductile, and mechanically weak region of Earth's mantle
- Continent – Large geographical region identified by convention
- Craton – Old and stable part of the continental lithosphere
  - Platform – Continental area covered by relatively flat or gently tilted, mainly sedimentary strata
  - Shield – Large stable area of exposed Precambrian crystalline rock
- Earth's crust – Earth's outer shell of rock
  - Continental crust – Layer of rock that forms the continents and continental shelves
  - Oceanic crust – Uppermost layer of the oceanic portion of a tectonic plate
- Earth's mantle – Layer of silicate rock
  - Lower mantle – Region from 660 to 2900 km below Earth's surface
  - Upper mantle – Very thick layer of rock inside Earth
- Geochemistry – Science that applies chemistry to analyze geological systems
  - Sial – Rocks rich in aluminium silicate minerals
  - Sima – Rocks rich in magnesium silicate minerals
- Hydrosphere – Liquid water on a planet
- Lithosphere – Outermost shell of a terrestrial-type planet or natural satellite
- Ocean – Body of salt water covering most of Earth
- Plate tectonics – Movement of Earth's lithosphere
  - List of tectonic plate interactions – Types of plate boundaries
- Supercontinent – Landmass comprising more than one continental core, or craton
- Terrane – Fragment of crust formed on one tectonic plate and accreted to another

== Notes and references ==
=== Bibliography ===
North Andes plate

- Restrepo, Jorge Julián; Ordóñez Carmona, Oswaldo; Martens, Uwe; Correa, Ana María (2009). "Terrenos, complejos y provincias en la Cordillera Central de Colombia (Terrains, complexes and provinces in the central cordillera of Colombia)". Ingeniería Investigación y Desarrollo. 9: 49–56.
- Fuck, Reinhardt A.; Brito Neves, Benjamim Bley; Schobbenhaus, Carlos (2008). "Rodinia descendants in South America". Precambrian Research. 160: 108–126.
- Cordani, U.G.; Cardona, A.; Jiménez, D.M.; Dunyl, L.; Nutman, A.P. (2003). Geochronology of Proterozoic basement from the Colombian Andes: Tectonic history of remnants from a fragmented Grenville Belt. 10^{o} Congreso Geológico Chileno. pp. 1–10.
- Restrepo, Jorge Julian; Toussaint, Jean F. (1988). "Terranes and continental accretion in the Colombian Andes". Episodes. 11: 189–193.
