= Bransfield Basin =

Geologic region in Antarctica

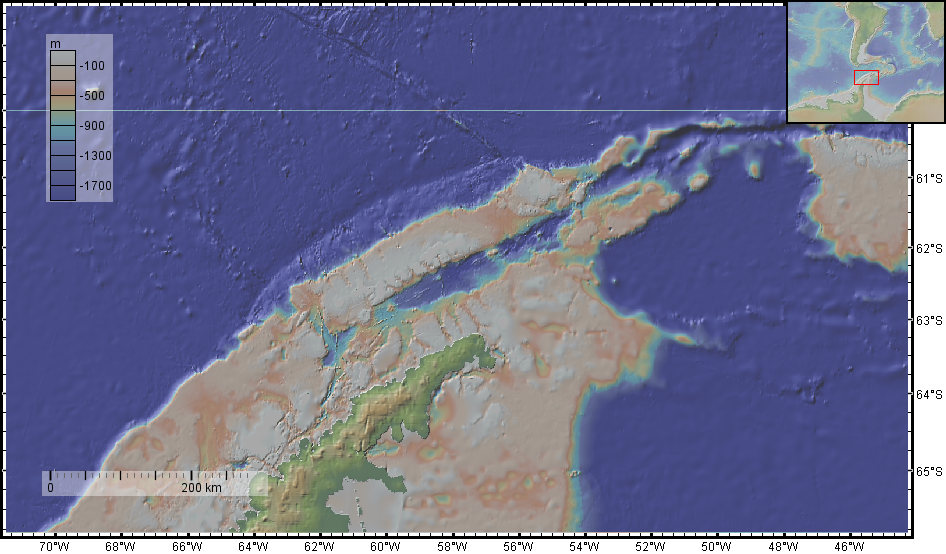
- Bathymetry map of the Bransfield Basin created using Geomap App software with a bathymetry map overlay with a distance and elevation scale.
- Type: Back-arc basin

Location
- Region: Northwest of the Antarctic Peninsula

Type section
- Country: Antarctica

The Bransfield Basin is a back-arc rift basin located off the northern tip of the Antarctic Peninsula. The basin lies within a Northeast and Southwest trending strait that separates the peninsula from the nearby South Shetland Islands to the Northwest. The basin extends for more than 500 kilometres (310 miles) from Smith Island (South Shetland Islands) to a portion of the Hero fracture zone. The basin can be subdivided into three basins: Western, Central, and Eastern. The Western basin is 130 kilometres (81 miles) long by 70 kilometres (43 miles) wide with a depth of 1.3 kilometres (1,400 yards), the Central basin is 230 kilometres (140 miles) long by 60 kilometres (37 miles) wide with a depth of 1.9 kilometres (2,100 yards), and the Eastern basin is 150 kilometres (93 miles) long by 40 kilometres (25 miles) wide with a depth of over 2.7 kilometres (3,000 yards). The three basins are separated by the Deception Island and Bridgeman Island. The moho depth in the region has been seismically interpreted to be roughly 34 kilometres (21 miles) deep.

== Tectonic development ==
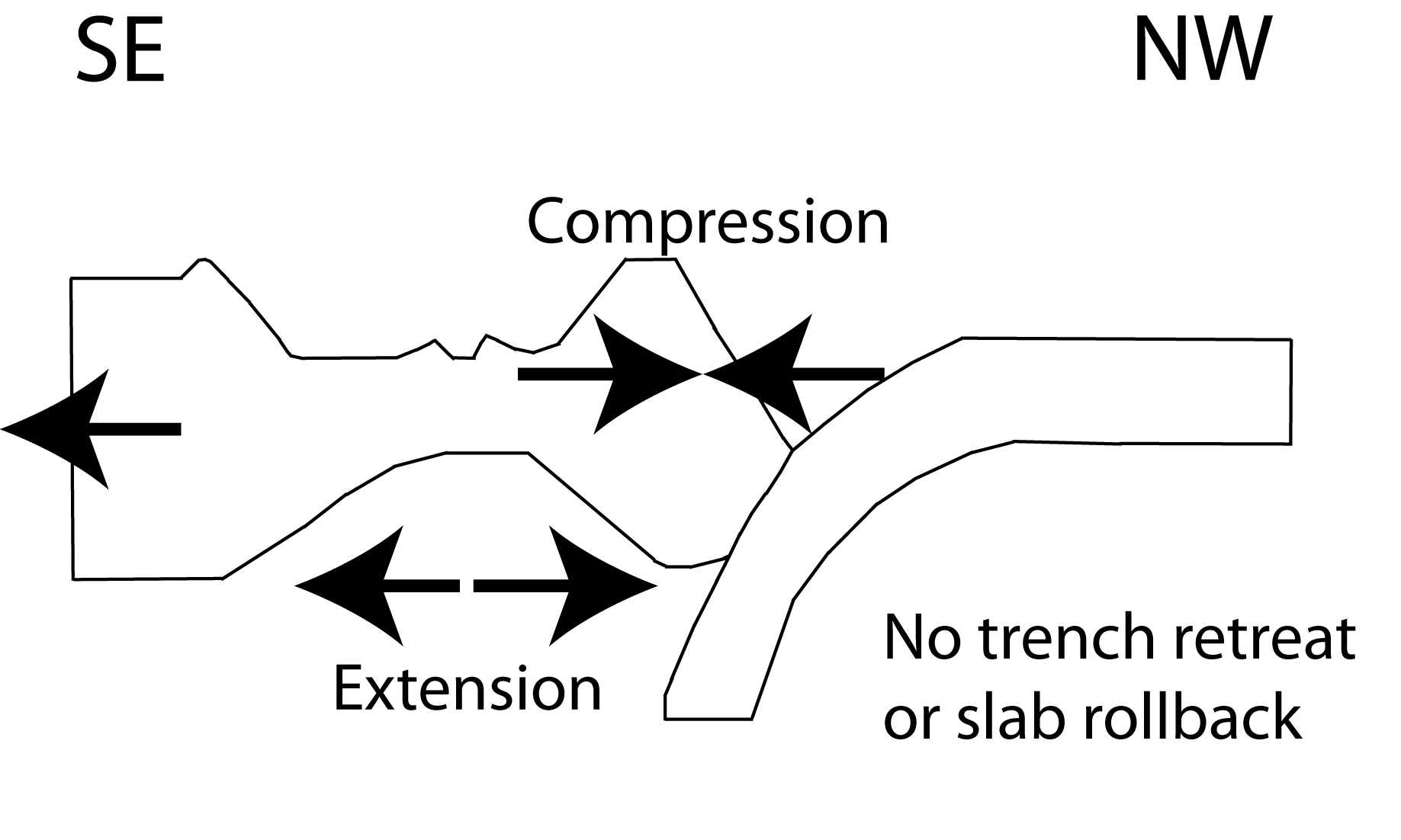
Schematic cartoon of the Bransfield Basin tectonic setting

The Bransfield Basin is considered to be a back-arc basin that is located behind the South Shetland Islands. The Islands are believed to have formed from a period of subduction that occurred between the Phoenix plate and the Antarctic plate starting roughly 200 million years ago during the Mesozoic. It is believed that the Phoenix plate stopped subducting under the Antarctic plate at least 4 million years ago during the Pliocene. Once the subduction ceased, it is believed that the extension that created the basin was initiated. Aeromagnetic surveys have provided evidence that the extension occurred 1.8 million years ago during the Pleistocene at a rate of 0.25 to 0.75 centimetres (1/10 to 3/10 inch) per year.

It is widely accepted that the Bransfield Basin formed from extension caused by slab rollback. New geophysical and structural data contradicts previously believed theories about slab rollback being the main mechanism for the opening of the basin. A newer theory for the opening of the basin is attributed to sinistral strike-slip motion between the Scotia plate and Antarctic plates. It is theorized that the trench between the Phoenix and Antarctic plates is locked in place and there is not any motion within the trench. The new data suggests trench retreat is not attributed as a mechanism for extension because there is a lack of seismic activity in the South Shetland Trench area, and that slab rollback is not a mechanism for extension either because if it were then northwest–southeast extension should be observed in the entire South Shetland region but instead compression can be observed. It is proposed that the motion between the Scotia plate and Antarctic plate are pushing the Phoenix plate to the Northwest creating compression.

There are 10 identified volcanoes along the 300 km long ridge from Bridgeman Island to Deception Island. Deception (30 km diameter base), Penguin (8 km diameter base), and Bridgeman (25 km diameter base) islands are the tops of Pleistocene-Recent stratovolcanoes, while 7 additional submarine volcanoes exist as seamounts, with the Orca Seamount being the largest (20 km diameter base).

== Geology ==
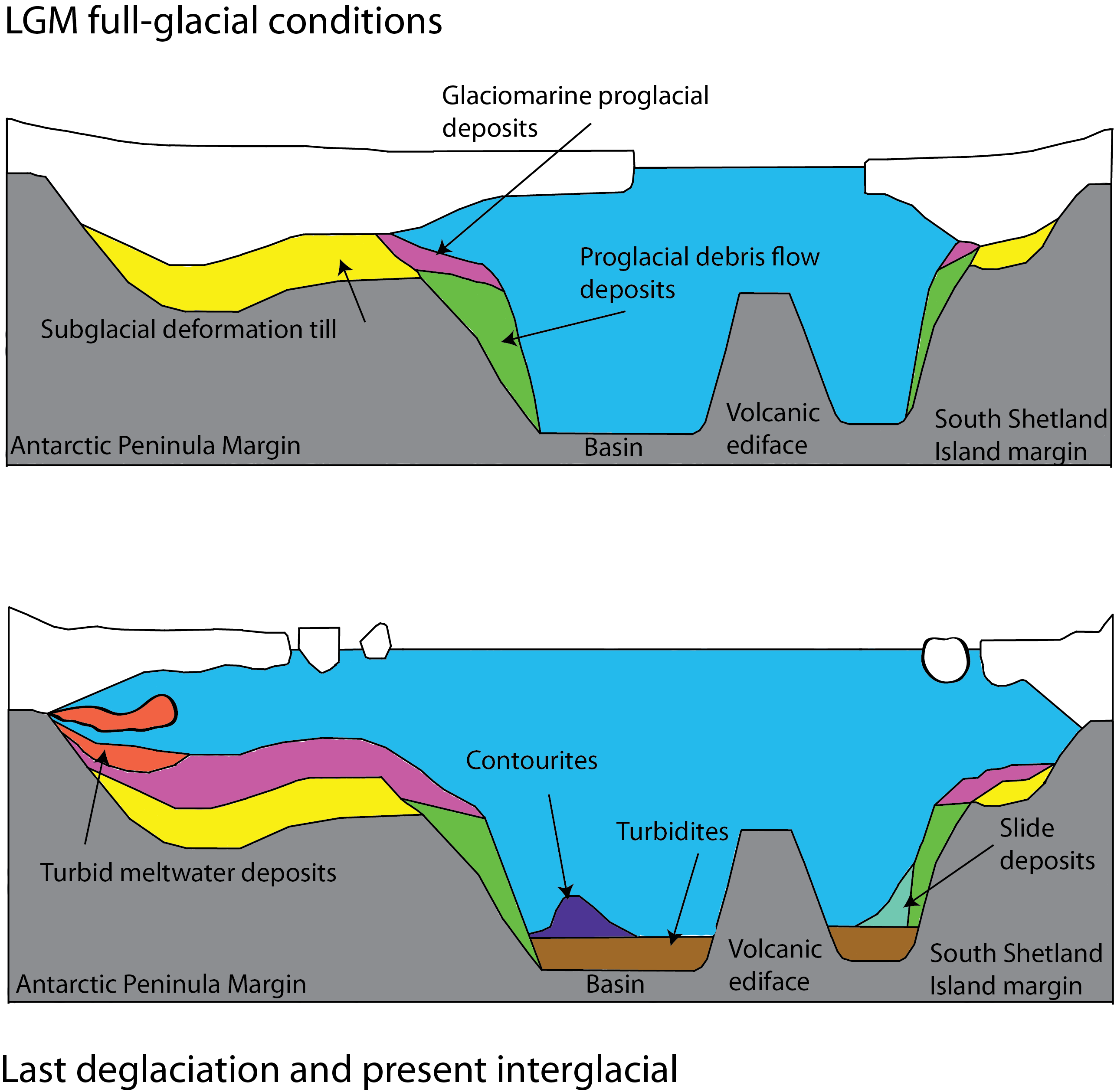
Cross section of the Bransfield Basin during alternating phases of glaciation

The main factor that controls deposition inside the Bransfield Basin is glacial cyclicity. Additional contributing factors include physiography, tectonics, and oceanography. Three stratigraphic units have been identified on the margins. The oldest unit is an over- consolidated diamicton from subglacial processes. The middle unit is a pebbly-sandy stratified mud from the proximal-ice or sub-ice shelf. The youngest unit consists of diatomaceous mud originating from open marine conditions. Sedimentary systems occur on the margins that are related to glacial and glacial marine, mass wasting, seabed fluid-escape, and contour current processes.

=== Glacial processes ===
Glacial processes have deposited a subglacial deformation till. The sediment that makes up this unit is derived from pressure melting of the glacier and from the substrate the glacier passed over. The subglacial deformation till unit is composed of a matrix-supported diamicton.

=== Glacial marine processes ===
Glacial marine processes have deposited two different units within the region. One of the units comprises proglacial debris flows have deposited a matrix-supported diamicton with interbeds of laminated mud on the lower portion of the continental slope. The other depositional process is a mixture of rain out from the ice from either melting or instantaneous dumping from the surface of an overturned portion of ice, and from marine rain out. The terrigenous and biogenic material compounds together to form sandy muds with sparse clasts.

=== Open marine processes ===
Open marine processes have deposited three units within the region. One of the units is a fining-upwards turbidity current deposit can be observed within the lower slope of the basin. Layers of volcanic ash around 1 to 4 centimetres (1/3 to 1 2/3 inches) thick are within the deposit. Another unit is a contorted/disturbed mud that makes up a slide unit. This unit is distinct because its angular contacts and disturbed structures that form from sediment reworking and plastic deformation from sliding. The third unit is a stratified mud with clast layers at the lower slope's foot. This unit is deposited from contour currents, and differences in clast size is attributed to shifting current conditions.

== Magmatism ==
The subduction event between the Phoenix plate and the Antarctic plate have built a volcanic arc consisting of low potassium to medium potassium content along the Antarctic Peninsula and South Shetland Islands. Volcanism occurred in multiple events during 130–110, 90–70, 60–40, and 30–20 million years ago. The paucity can be interpreted as subducting younger crust or subsidence the post 20 million years arc after the basin formed. Volcanism is widespread within the Quaternary which created a series of submarine volcanoes. The submarine volcanoes produce glassy lavas ranging in compositions similar to what would be expected in arcs higher in large-ion lithophile elements to enriched mid-ocean ridge basalts.

The Bransfield Basin is abnormal when it comes to the style of volcanism that can be observed within the basin. Undersea volcanoes experience what is called bimodal volcanism. Igneous rocks within the basin are andesite and basalt. The closer to the center of the undersea volcanoes the composition of the rocks shifts towards more felsic rock types such as rhyolite, rhyodacite, and dacite. The source of this phenomenon is interpreted as a result from indicate formation from partial melting or fractional crystallization. This type of volcanism is commonly observed in Phanerozoic volcanic massive sulfide systems, and is not commonly observed in modern back-arc basins. Examples of where bimodal volcanism can be observed are the Okinawa Trough and the Sumizu Rift.

The occurrence of incipient seafloor spreading in the basin is under controversy. Some researchers suggest that it does not occur within the basin because of the crustal thickness, magnetic anomaly patterns, and intracrustal diapirism. Other geoscientists suggest that it is occurring and is related to seamount volcanism and normal faulting within the basin.

=== Seismic swarm of 2020-2021 ===
In August 2020, the largest seismic swarm recorded in the history of the region began to occur. Between 36,000 and 85,000 earthquakes were detected in just a few months, with earthquakes up to magnitude 6.0. The swarm was located off King George Island, just a few kilometers from the Orca Seamount, which was thought to be extinct. Some studies indicate that the earthquakes were produced by magmatic intrusion, although there is no precise evidence that the volcano has erupted due to low instrumentation in the area.

== See also ==
- Adare Basin
- Antarctica
- Back-arc basin
- Bransfield Strait
- Geology of the Antarctic Peninsula
- Glacial period
- Oceanic basin
- Seafloor spreading
- Shetland plate
- Subduction
