= Bridgeman Island (South Shetland Islands) =

Island in Antarctica

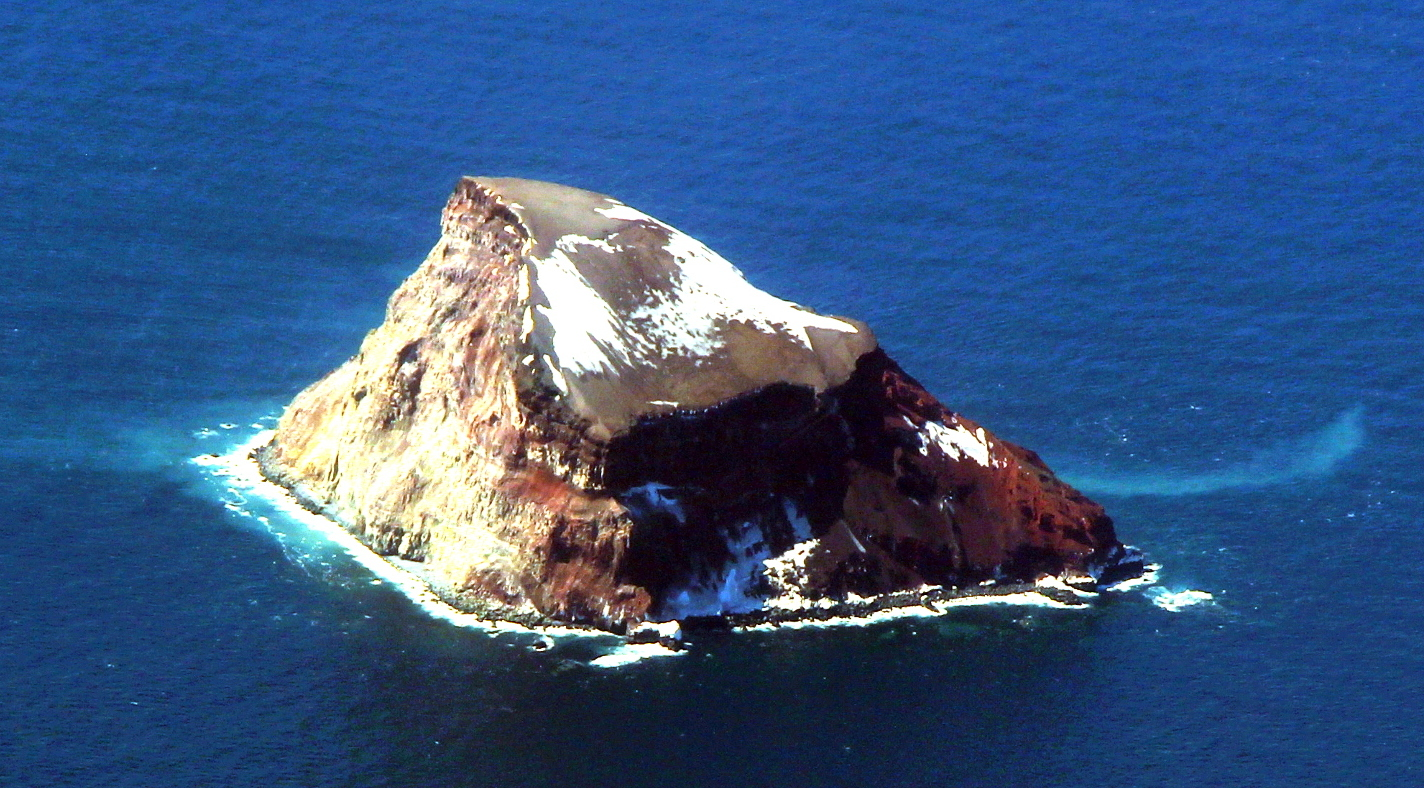
- Aerial view of Bridgeman Island

- Location within Antarctica Location within Antarctic Peninsula

Geography
- Location: Antarctica
- Coordinates: 62°03′S 56°45′W
- Archipelago: South Shetland Islands
- Total islands: 2
- Length: 0.9 km (0.56 mi)
- Width: 0.6 km (0.37 mi)
- Highest elevation: 240 m (790 ft)

Administration
- Administered under the Antarctic Treaty System

Bridgeman Island is one of the South Shetland Islands in Antarctica. It is an almost circular, volcanic island marked by steep sides, measuring 900 by 600 metres (3,000 ft × 2,000 ft) with a maximum elevation of 240 m (787 ft) high, lying 45 kilometres (28 mi) east of King George Island.

It is surrounded by steep cliffs and consists mostly of lava flows and scoria, subdivided in two geological units. Bridgeman Island is the emergent portion of a larger volcano in the Bransfield Strait, which contains numerous volcanoes including Deception Island and numerous seamounts. The island formed during the Pleistocene; there is evidence of an eruption in 1821 that generated a probable tuff cone west of Bridgeman Island, which has now disappeared.

== Geology and geomorphology ==
=== Regional ===
Antarctica features numerous volcanoes, 12 of which (e.g. Mount Melbourne, Mount Erebus, Mount Berlin, Deception Island) are known to be active or potentially active. A peak in volcanic activity took place during the Jurassic, when the ancient continent Gondwana broke up.

Bridgeman Island lies in the eastern Bransfield Strait, 45 kilometres (28 mi) away from King George Island. The strait separates the South Shetland Islands (including King George Island) to the northwest from the Antarctic Peninsula to the southeast. There are a number of mostly submarine volcanoes; from northeast to southwest these include: Gibbs Rise, Spanish Rise, G Ridge, Bridgeman Rise (with Bridgeman Island), Hook Ridge, Orca volcano, Three Sisters, Edifice A, Deception Island (with the eponymous island) and Sail Rock with the eponymous island. The volcanoes produce mainly basaltic rocks with a characteristic sodium-rich composition. Apart from discrete volcanoes, hydrothermal phenomena, high heat flow and earthquakes occur in the Bransfield Strait. The line Deception Island-Bridgeman Island coincides with the axis of the Bransfield rift. The origin of Bransfield Strait took place during the last 4 million years and is linked to the cessation of subduction off the Antarctic Peninsula, although the exact mechanism through which the strait opened is unclear.

=== Local ===
Bridgeman Island is slightly elongated in north–southeast direction, measuring 900 by 600 metres (3,000 ft × 2,000 ft). It is surrounded on all sides by high cliffs, especially on the almost vertical western side, and lacks beaches and raised beaches except for a narrow gravelly beach on the eastern side. The inner parts of the island are flat and undulating; the highest peak reaches an elevation of 240 metres (790 ft). The terrain was often covered with snow. A small islet lies off its northern tip. It has been described as a remnant of a stratovolcano.

Bridgeman Island consists entirely of volcanic rocks and lacks volcanic landforms. The rocks are subdivided in three units, the southeastern Lower Unit consisting of thin lava flows and scoria, the central Upper Unit formed by scoria and thick lavas, and the western unit that is formed by fragments from both other units. Below sea level, Bridgeman Island extends to a depth of 1,200 metres (3,900 ft), forming the 10 by 15 kilometres (6.2 mi × 9.3 mi) Bridgeman Rise. The volcano is the second-most voluminous volcano of the Bransfield Strait, with a peak-to-bottom height of 1.7 kilometres (1.1 mi). It separates the deep basin of the Bransfield Strait into an eastern and central segment, and its position may coincide with a boundary between segments of the Bransfield rift. Around Bridgeman Island, there are submarine mounds and volcanic plugs that rise to a depth of 45 metres (148 ft) below sea level; otherwise, the local bathymetry is sparsely known. Hydrothermal activity has been recorded between Deception Island and Bridgeman Island, as well as east of Bridgeman Island.

The volcanic rocks of Bridgeman Island are formed by basaltic andesite and subalkaline basalt, and there is one questionable occurrence of dacite. These rocks define an aluminum-rich suite and share compositional traits with both mid-ocean ridge-derived and island arc-derived magmas. Augite, diopside, olivine and plagioclase form phenocrysts. The magmas of Bridgeman Island may have formed through the incomplete melting of spinel peridotite, with 10–20% of the resulting melt ending up as the magma. Melts derived from the slab and fractional crystallization may also have played a role. Hydrothermal alteration has yielded secondary minerals such as calcite, chalcedony, hematite and limonite, giving the rocks a deep red colour.

== Name and research history ==
Bridgeman Island was discovered on 21 January 1820 by the mariner William Smith from the William, and named presumably after Charles Orlando Bridgeman. Other names include Yelena, as given by Bellingshausen, the misspelling Bridgman and Burning Mount or Brians Isle, by captain Richard Sherratt.

== Eruption history ==
The island formed through Surtseyan eruptions and was apparently never significantly eroded by glaciers. The older volcanism is undated; a younger volcanic event occurred 63,000±25,000 years ago. It is possible that either the eruptions occurred during times of low sea levels or that the island subsided over time, explaining why it was not significantly eroded by the sea. The volcano may have produced tephra during the Holocene, which was identified in marine sediment cores.

=== Historical activity and 1821 eruption ===
Bridgeman Island was the first volcano in Antarctica to be recognized as active and the first to be observed as erupting. An eruption in 1821 was observed by numerous passing ships. Until 2021, it was attributed to Penguin Island, which has young-looking volcanic features but no clear evidence of recent activity. From its discovery to 1835, the shape of the island did not change significantly, although comparisons of sketches of the island during the 19th century with modern images imply that parts of the island disappeared after the 19th century.

Based on observations from passing ships, it seems like the eruption commenced in January 1821 and ended at some point between 1853 and 1909. From the observations, it appears that the eruption originated from what was probably a tuff ring on the southwestern side of the island. Repeated explosions were seen, which belched black smoke at irregular intervals as vents shut off and reopened. The crater may have reached a width of 500–600 metres (1,600–2,000 ft). Accounts mention that the smoke smelled of sulfur, dead penguins floating in the water, and of boiling water and rock so hot that it could not be touched. The tuff ring or vent on the southwestern end of the island may have significantly enlarged Bridgeman Island while it existed, possibly extending it by more than 2 kilometres (1.2 mi). It disappeared after the eruption, probably due to marine erosion, as such shallow-water volcanoes are highly erodible.

=== Later activity and present-day status ===
Dumont D'Urville reported fumaroles on the western side in 1838 and thought that part of the island must have collapsed in the past. There are reports of eruptions in 1838, 1839 and 1850, sometimes attributed to Penguin Island instead; reports of an eruption in 1909 are false. Seismic swarms in the Bransfield Strait have been localized to Orca seamount and Bridgeman Island. In 2022, acoustic anomalies were identified at a seamount southeast of Bridgeman Island and at a submarine depression on the same side of the island. They may imply the occurrence of hydrothermal activity at Bridgeman Island. However, no heated ground was reported on Bridgeman Island in 2013.

== Life ==
Lichens and mosses grow on the island, which otherwise lacks vegetation. Crustaceans occur in the neighbouring sea, and snow petrels have been observed.

== See also ==
- Composite Antarctic Gazetteer
- List of Antarctic and sub-Antarctic islands
- List of Antarctic islands south of 60° S
- List of volcanoes in Antarctica
- SCAR
- Territorial claims in Antarctica
