= Moa plate =

Ancient oceanic plate south of the Pacific–Phoenix Ridge

The Moa plate was an ancient oceanic plate that formed in the Early Cretaceous south of the Pacific–Phoenix Ridge. The Moa plate was obliquely subducted beneath the Gondwana margin, but some material from it was accreted and continues to exist. Today, this material forms part of Eastern New Zealand. The plate was named in 2001 by Rupert Sutherland and Chris Hollis.
