= Orca Seamount =

Underwater volcano near King George Island in Antarctica

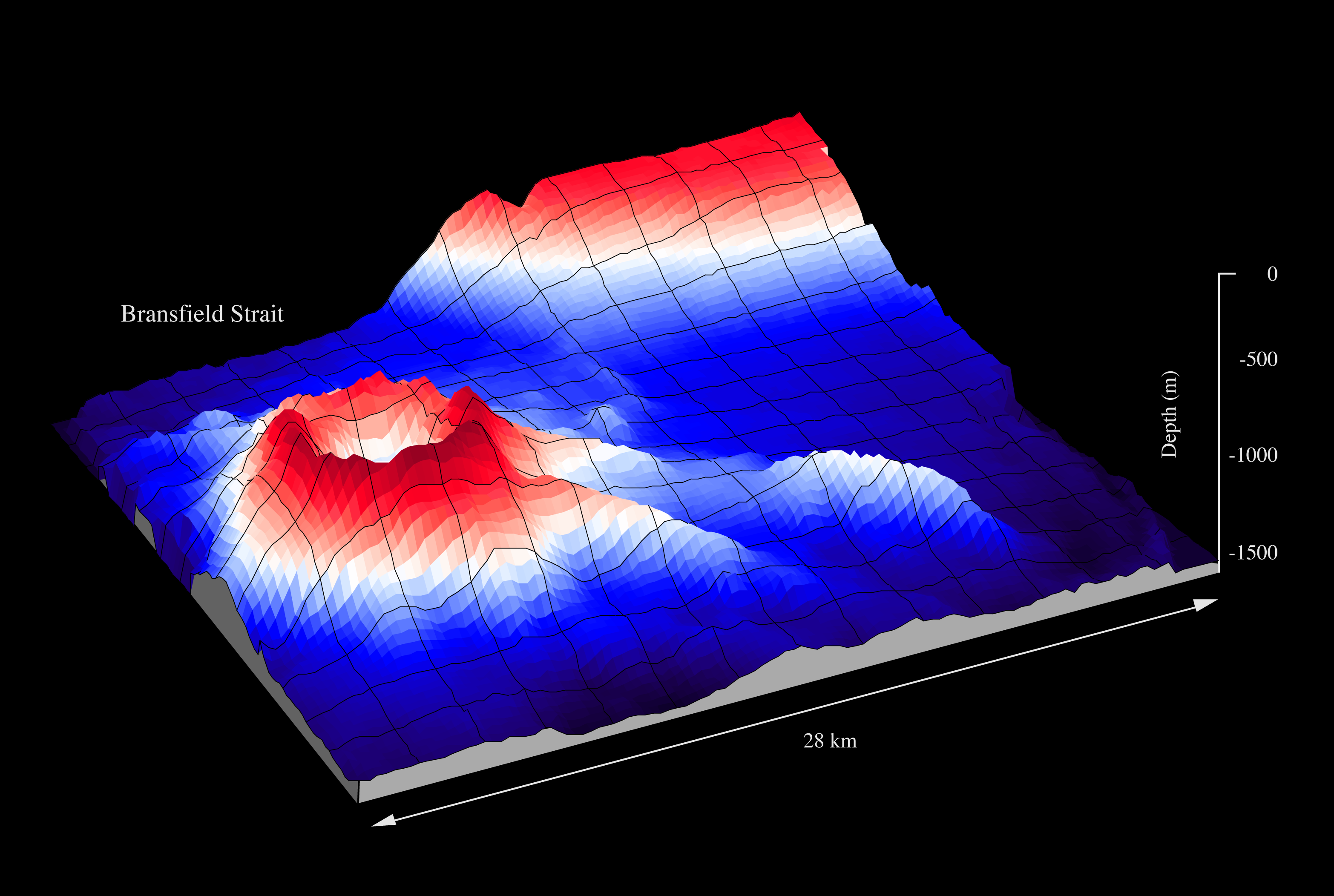
- Bathemetric mapping of the seamount, mapped with the swath sonar system of RV Polarstern during cruise ANT-XI/3.

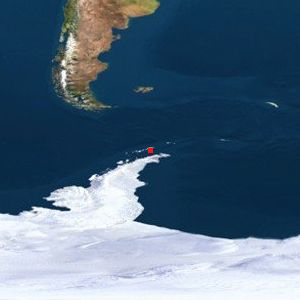
- Location of Orca Seamount
- Height: About 500 m (1,600 ft)

Location
- Location: Near King George Island, Antarctica
- Coordinates: 62°26′00″S 58°24′00″W

Geology
- Type: Underwater volcano (Seamount)

Orca Seamount is a submarine volcano near King George Island in Antarctica, in the Bransfield Strait. While it is inactive, the last volcanic activity at Orca Seamount is judged to have occurred in the recent past as there are temperature anomalies in the seawater around the seamount. Thermophilic and hyperthermophilic microorganisms have been found at the seamount.

The crater rim is about 3 km (1.9 mi) wide and about 500 m (1,600 ft) above the ocean floor.

The seamount was first named by Professor O. González-Ferrán of Chile in 1987, after the orca (killer whale) often sighted in these waters. It was mapped and studied by the ship RV Polarstern during an Antarctic cruise (number ANT-XI/3) in 2005. The variant name of Viehoff Seamount (approved in 6/95 ACUF 263) was named for Dr. Thomas Viehoff, a remote sensing specialist in marine sciences. Name proposed by Dr. G.B. Udintsev, Vernadsky Institute of Geochemistry (VIG).

== Geology ==
The submarine volcano is a Pleistocene-Recent shield volcano within the Bransfield Basin. The volcano has a base diameter of 20 km (12 mi), and a height of 1,000 m (3,300 ft). Samples obtained from Orca Seamount were identified as basalt and basaltic andesites, suggesting the existence of more differentiated products, such as dacites or rhyolites.

The area presents geodynamic extension conditions as a consequence of a complex interaction of the Scotia, Antarctic and ancient Phoenix tectonic plates.

=== Seismic swarm of 2020–2021 ===
In August 2020, the largest seismic swarm recorded in the history of the region began to occur. Between 36,000 and 85,000 earthquakes were detected in just a few months, with earthquakes up to magnitude 6.0. The swarm was located off King George Island, just a few kilometers from the Orca Seamount, which was thought to be extinct. Some studies indicate that the earthquakes were produced by magmatic intrusion, although there is no precise evidence that the volcano has erupted due to low instrumentation in the area.
