= Deacon Peak =

Deacon Peak (62°6′S 57°54′W) is a peak, 170 metres (560 ft) high, marking the summit of Penguin Island, at the east side of the entrance to King George Bay, in the South Shetland Islands. It was charted in 1937 by Discovery Investigations personnel on the Discovery II, who named it for Sir George E.R. Deacon.
