= Adare Basin =

Geologic structural basin by Antarctica

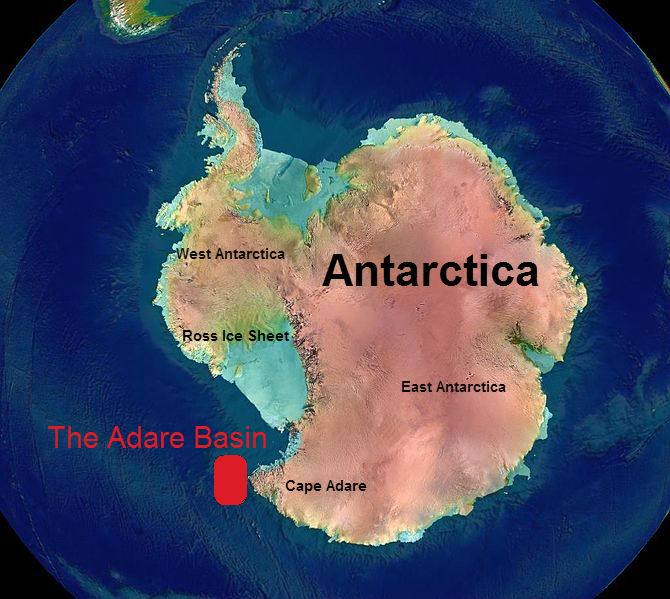
Antarctica Relief map with highlighted Adare Basin and relevant locations labeled

The Adare Basin is a geologic structural basin located north-east of Cape Adare of Antarctica, for which its named, and north of the western Ross Sea. The Adare Basin is an extensional rift basin located along a seafloor spreading center that forms the failed arm of the Tertiary spreading ridge separating East and West Antarctica, known as the West Antarctic Rift System and similar in structure to the East Africa Rift System. Centrally located in the Adare Basin is the Adare Trough. The extension of this rift system is recorded in a series of magnetic anomalies which run along the seafloor at the extinct, north–south trending, Adare spreading axis. The Adare spreading system continues unbroken into the Northern Basin underlying the adjacent Ross Sea continental shelf.

== Antarctic extension ==
The continent of Antarctica is divided into two continental blocks, separated by the Transantarctic Mountains of the West Antarctic Rift System. East Antarctica, also known as Greater Antarctica, composes two-thirds of the landmass of Antarctica and is considered the coldest and driest landmass on Earth. East Antarctica is a stable craton of Precambrian age. Meanwhile, West Antarctica is an orogenic belt composed of several smaller units, which converged 100 ma. These units are covered in a vast ice sheet, known as the West Antarctic Ice Sheet. Two major extensional events have affected the West Antarctic Rift System. This led to the formation of a series of continuous, north–south trending basins stretching from the Transantarctic mountains out into the Ross Sea embayment. The first is associated with the breakup of the supercontinent, Gondwana (Gondwanaland), during the Jurassic or Cretaceous. The second, is associated with the formation of the West Antarctic Rift System between East and West Antarctica, which began in the Eocene and lasted into the late Oligocene era. This extensional phase was responsible for the formations of the basins on the continental shelf, including the Adare Basin. There has been considerable debate over the kinematic history of the West Antarctic Rift System.

=== Adare extension ===
Since the Middle Cretaceous Era 100 million years ago, paleomagnetic measurements suggest that there have been between 500 and 1,000 km (310 and 620 mi) transtentional motions between East and West Antarctica. Offset magnetic lineations can be used to establish spreading history of the Adare Basin specifically. These resolvable marine magnetic anomalies run along the spreading axis of the Adare basin and reveal a rate of extension between the plates. Extension took place for 17 million years during the middle Cenozoic Era, from between 43 and 26 million years ago. Seafloor spreading in the basin took place at a constant rate in opposite directions, the seafloor spread faster in an eastward direction at a rate of 7.5 mm/year, while it spread to the west at a rate of 5 mm/year. This spreading has accounted for about 170 km of plate separation. The formation of the Adare Trough, an uplift feature, formed as a result of fault reactivation within the first 5 million years after spreading stopped. No significant extension takes place in the Adare Basin after the Adare trough in the Neogene Era from 23–3 million years ago. The set of magnetic lineations defining the Adare Basin continue unbroken under the adjacent continental shelf of north western Ross Sea. These anomaly lineations coincide with the Northern Basin, implying that Northern Basin is floored by oceanic crust that was subsequently infilled by younger sediments to form the morphological continental shelf. In addition, rupture of the continental crust in this region must have occurred at the onset of Adare Basin formation

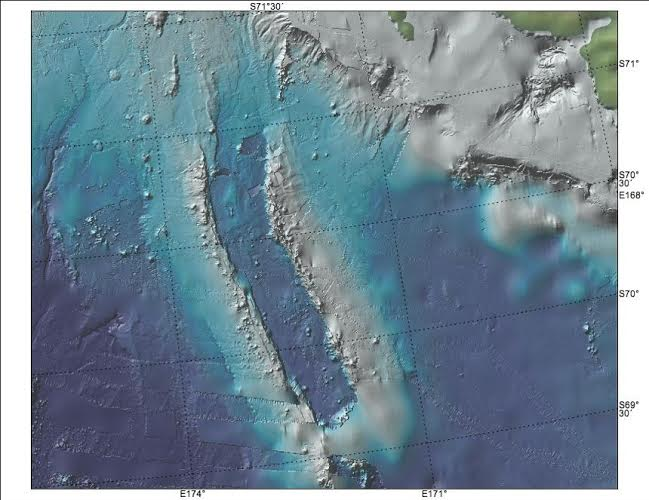
Geologic map of the Adare Basin off coast of Antarctica. Adare Trough prominent in center of image.

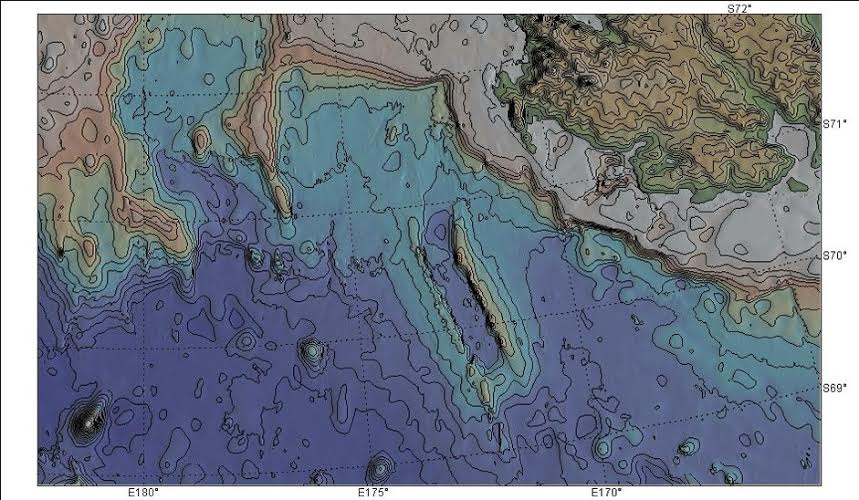
Geologic map of the Adare Basin with 250 meter contour lines highlighted

== The Adare Trough ==
The Adare Trough is a single, northwest–southeast trending, graben roughly 120 km (75 mi) long with high rifted flanks located centrally in the Adare Basin, 100 km (62 mi) northwest of Cape Adare. The flanks are roughly 40 km (25 mi) apart and are asymmetrical when compared to one another, with the East flank rising higher than the west by roughly 550 meters. The major uplift required to form the Adare trough marks the last major extensional phase of the Adare basin. Magnetic anomalies curve southwards from the Adare Trough towards the Ross Sea, indicating the Adare Trough is part of the extinct third arm of a West Antarctic Rift System ridge-ridge-ridge triple junction.

Numerous volcanic cones are located on the eastern half of the Adare Trough, as well as in the eastern end of the basin. Furthermore, seismic reflections of the trough indicate a shallow basement. These observations indicate an upwelling of hot mantle material resulted in a shallow lithosphere basement, which is further supported by low seismic velocities underneath the trough.

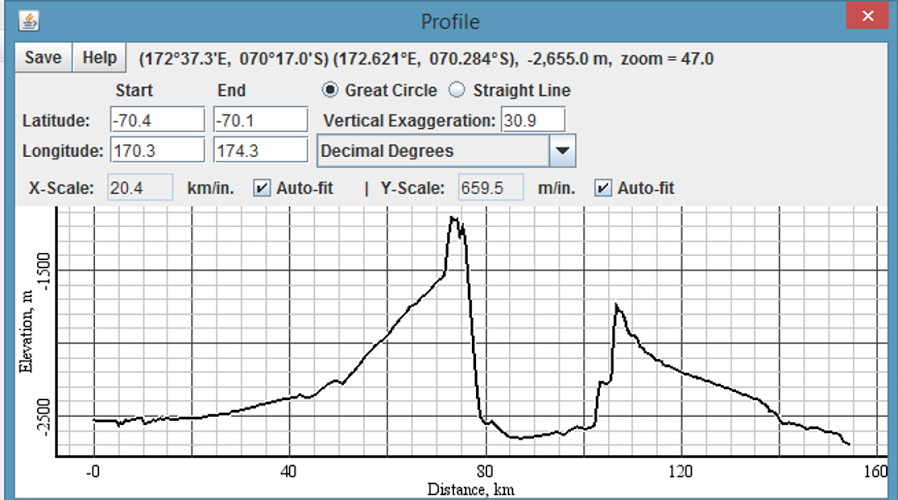
Topographic Profile of the ocean floor surface of the Adare Basin

== Tectonic evolution ==
Seismic reflection and swath bathymetry data in the Adare Basin and the adjacent Ross Sea shelf reveal three major tectonic events in recent times.

=== Oligocene event ===
The first event is one of Brittle deformation of the basin, and is represented by the appearance of normal faulting which took place ~24 Ma. The faults dip toward the spreading axis and may have reactivated preexisting tectonic structures in order to begin the formation of the Adare Trough. This faulting resulted in negligible extension of less than 2 km, and did not seem to extend outside the basin. This faulting played an important role in the modern day sediment supply to the basin.

=== Early Miocene event ===
The second is an early Miocene (roughly 17 million years ago) rifting event which produced half grabens composed of west tilted blocks and east dipping normal faults which extended the basin between 3–5 km (1.9–3.1 mi). Faulting resulted in the uplift of the western flank and southeastern corner of the Adare Trough, and subsidence south and southwest of the trough. The tilted blocks align in a northeast–southwest direction that starts south of the Adare Trough and heads toward Cape Adare. Faulting reached the shelf edge, indicating that this event was probably linked with rifting activity outside the basin, most likely with the east dipping faulting in the Northern Basin, a neighboring sedimentary basin in the Ross Embayment. No motion is observed in the Victoria Land Basin during this interval, as expected given its proximity to the Eocene-Oligocene pole of rotation. The pole of rotation between East and West Antarctica remained in the same location until the end of the early Miocene. This event marks the last major extension activity in the Adare Basin.

=== Pliocene event ===
The final event during the Pliocene marks the youngest phase of tectonic activity in the Adare Basin. Igneous material penetrated the sedimentary stratigraphy to create volcanic cones which protrude from the sediment stratigraphy, as well as subhorizontal and saucer-shaped sills interrupting the stratigraphy. 257 different volcanic features have been mapped in the basin, partially covered by additional sediment. Geochemical analyses of the Pliocene basalts and the southwest–northeast trending spatial distribution of volcanic centers within and outside the Adare Basin indicate a relation to the Miocene volcanic activity found on land southwest of the basin. Steep normal faults produced prominent seafloor scarps but resulted in only a minor extensional component. At this stage, in terms of horizontal motion, the Adare Basin is nearly locked.

== Stratigraphy ==
=== Sedimentation ===
Most sedimentation in the Adare Basin took place after the second extensional event. Sedimentation offshore Antarctica is primarily driven by pelagic settling, down-slope gravity flows, and across-slope current flows driven by the Antarctic Circumpolar Current. The continental slope in the Adare Basin is very steep and sinuous, causing turbidite channels to be common. Several Antarctic deep water currents are also responsible for depositing large amounts of sediment into the basin. Early Miocene tectonic faulting caused stratigraphic unconformities within the Adare Basin. These unconformities separate the deposition pattern into three characteristically unique domains of stratigraphic units in the Adare Basin. These are the West, East, and Center units, with the Center unit being inside the Adare Trough and along the spreading axis. Seismic transects reveal faster seismic velocities, deeper in the center the West units of the basin, while faster velocities are detected shallower to the northeast of the trough in the East unit. This indicates that the stacked layers of sediment are thicker above the spreading axis than above the flanks of the trough.

=== Stratigraphic units ===
Small sonar systems attached to floating buoys, called sonobuoys have been used by geologists to shoot seismic transects across the Adare Basin in order to establish 2D velocity models of the subsurface stratigraphy beneath the seafloor down to a depth of 5.5 km. The deeper deposited sediment has been compacted under heavier pressures for longer time periods, causing the sediment to become denser and the velocity of the seismic waves to increase with depth. Velocities from beneath the Adare Trough tend to be slightly higher than the average, indicating that the lithosphere is slightly thicker underneath the trough than the surrounding basin. Within the depth capable of measurement 6 distinct stratigraphic units have been established with characteristic velocities. The first unit begins at the seafloor with a velocity of 2000 m/s. The second unit lies 0.6 km beneath the seafloor and waves propagate with a velocity of 3000 m/s. The third layer begins at 1.8 km beneath the seafloor and has a velocity of 4200 m/s. The next layer begins at 2.3 km and has a velocity of 4900 m/s, followed by a layer at 3.1 km with 5700 m/s wave velocity. The final layer lies 3.3 km beneath the surface and displays velocities of 6000 m/s.

=== Lithosphere and basement character ===
Seismic transects, using sonobuoys, reveal additional crustal structures beneath layers of sediment, which the Moho is defined in the basin by a seismic velocity of 8000 m/s. The total lithospheric thickness of the basin is thicker along the central Trough and along the southwest end closest to the continental shelf. These reading measure to a basement depth of 5–6 km. Fast velocities detected in shallower depths are consistent with the presence of oceanic crust measurements, indicating the Adare basin extends past the continental shelf and onto the oceanic plate. This further confirms the presence of initiation of seafloor spreading along the spreading axis before the extinction of rifting in the Adare Basin.

== See also ==
- Bransfield Basin
