= Rupert Sutherland =

New Zealand geologist

Rupert Sutherland FRSNZ
- Born: 1967 (age 58–59)
- Title: Professor
- Awards: Hutton Medal (2022)

Academic background
- Education: University of Otago
- Thesis: Late Cenozoic tectonics in the SW Pacific, and development of the Alpine Fault through southern South Island, New Zealand (1995)
- Doctoral advisor: Richard Norris

Academic work
- Discipline: Geology
- Sub-discipline: Geophysics and tectonics
- Institutions: GNS Science; Victoria University of Wellington
- Notable ideas: Moa Plate

Mark Rupert Sutherland FRSNZ (born 1967) is a New Zealand geologist and academic specialising in tectonics and geophysics at the Victoria University of Wellington and a principal scientist at GNS Science. Sutherland has been described as "one of New Zealand’s leading earth science researchers" by the Royal Society of New Zealand.

== Education ==
Sutherland completed his BA with honours from the University of Cambridge in 1989. His PhD at the University of Otago in 1995 was on the development of the Alpine Fault.

== Career and impact ==
Sutherland's research has included the deep ocean drilling of the Zealandian continent and ancient climate change. He has identified and named the ancient Moa tectonic plate.

He is a co-leader of the Deep Fault Drilling Project (DFDP) of the Alpine Fault. As a result of this project, exceptionally high heat flow was discovered on the West Coast. Sutherland was the lead author reporting this in Nature.

Sutherland is often used by the national and international media as an expert on seismic surveys, earthquakes and geology in general. His involvement of the promotion of Zealandia to a continent gained a particularly high amount of media attention.

== Awards and honours ==
- Fellow of the Royal Society of New Zealand
- Hamilton Award
- Hutton Medal for "fundamental discoveries in global plate tectonics, the evolution of Zealandia and the implications for active faulting and large magnitude earthquakes in New Zealand".
