= Phoenix plate =

Tectonic plate that existed during the early Paleozoic through late Cenozoic time

Coordinates: 60°18′57″S 62°48′23″W

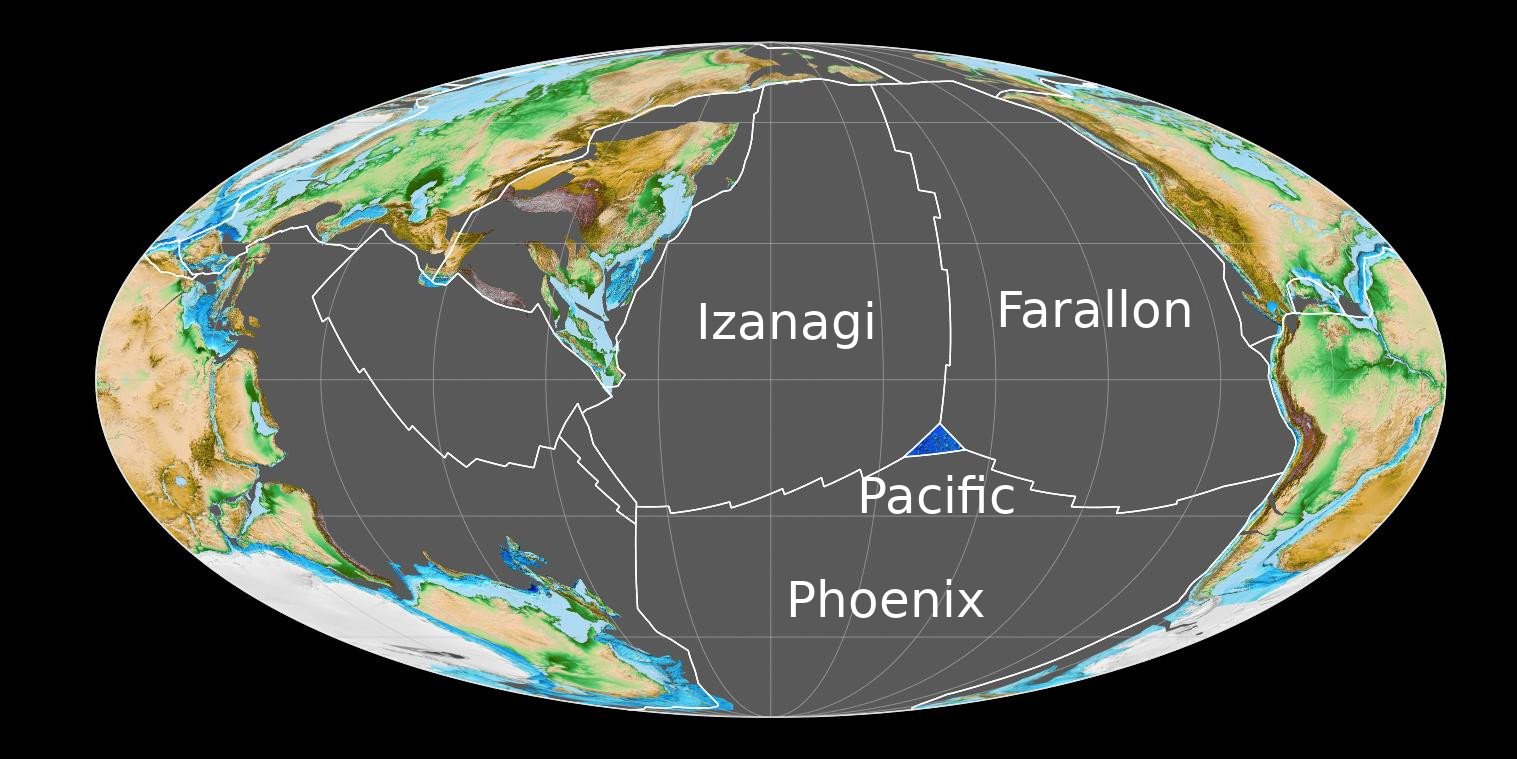
- The Panthalassa Ocean 180 million years ago, showing the Phoenix plate in the south, the Farallon plate in the northeast, the Izanagi plate in the northwest and the newly formed Pacific plate in the center
- Type: Historical

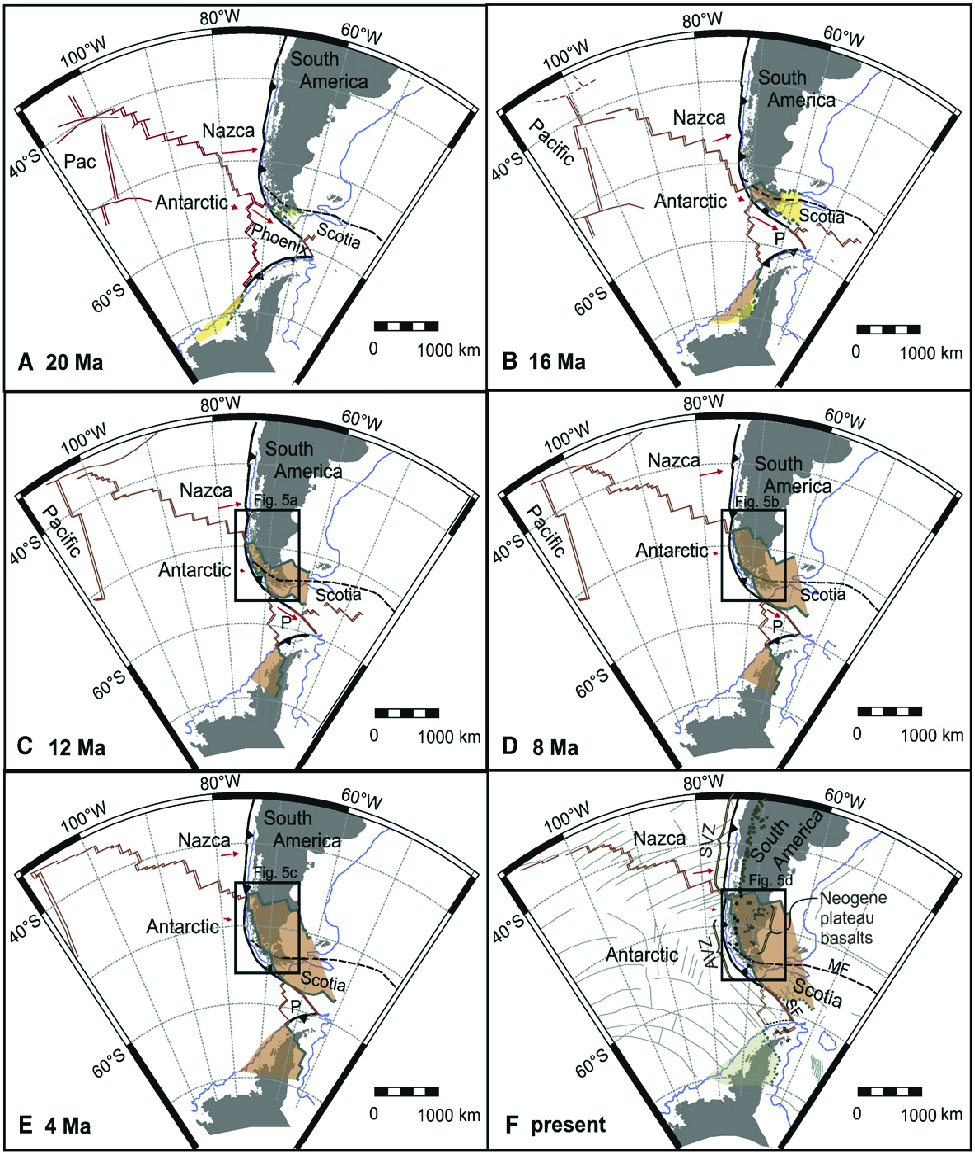
The small remaining piece of the plate can be seen in the bottom right (present day) image

The Phoenix plate (also known as the Aluk plate or Drake plate) was a tectonic plate that existed during the early Paleozoic through late Cenozoic time. It formed a triple junction with the Izanagi and Farallon plates in the Panthalassa Ocean as early as 410 million years ago, during which time the Phoenix plate was subducting under eastern Gondwana.

By the late Jurassic–early Cretaceous, 150–130 million years ago, the Pacific plate arose from the Izanagi–Farallon–Phoenix triple junction, resulting in the creation of the Izanagi–Pacific–Farallon, Izanagi–Pacific–Phoenix and Farallon–Pacific–Phoenix triple junctions. Subduction ceased east of Australia about 120 million years ago, during which time a transform/transpressional boundary formed. This boundary with the Phoenix plate lasted until about 80 million years ago as the plate continued to descend southwards as a result of Late Cretaceous subduction under the Antarctic Peninsula.

During the Late Cretaceous or early Cenozoic, the southwestern part of the Phoenix plate fragmented into the Charcot plate, much in the same way in which the Rivera and Cocos plates were formed by the fragmentation of the Farallon plate.

The Antarctic–Phoenix Ridge, a mid-oceanic ridge between the Antarctic and Phoenix plates, initiated following Late Cretaceous to early Cenozoic times when the Phoenix plate had divergent boundaries with the Bellingshausen and Pacific plates in the southwestern Pacific Ocean. A major decrease in spreading rate of the Antarctic–Phoenix Ridge and the convergence rate of the Phoenix plate with the Antarctic plate occurred around 52.3 million years ago, followed by subduction of a segment of the Antarctic–Phoenix Ridge between 50 and 43 million years ago.

Although active subduction occurred for over 100 million years, it slowed dramatically or stopped entirely about 3.3 million years ago when seafloor spreading on the Antarctic–Phoenix Ridge ceased, leaving a small remnant of the former Phoenix plate incorporated in the Antarctic plate. This remnant underlies the southwest Drake Passage and is surrounded by the Shackleton fracture zone in the northeast, the Hero fracture zone in the southwest, the South Shetland Trough in the southeast and the extinct Antarctic–Phoenix Ridge in the northwest.
