= Sail Rock (South Shetland Islands) =

Exposed sea stack in Antarctica

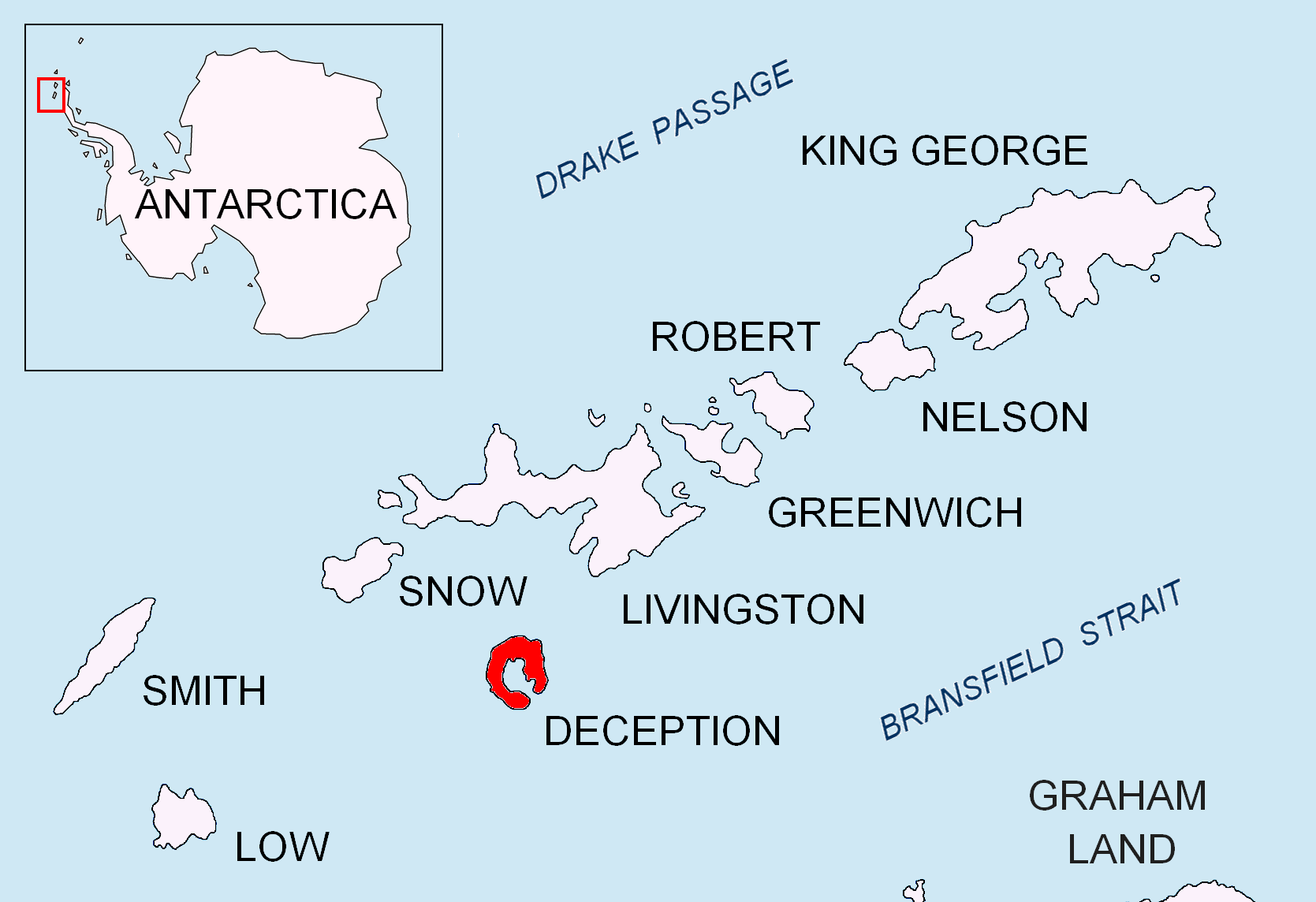
Location of Deception Island in the South Shetland Islands

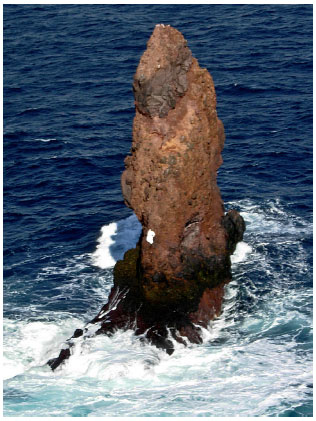
Sail rock

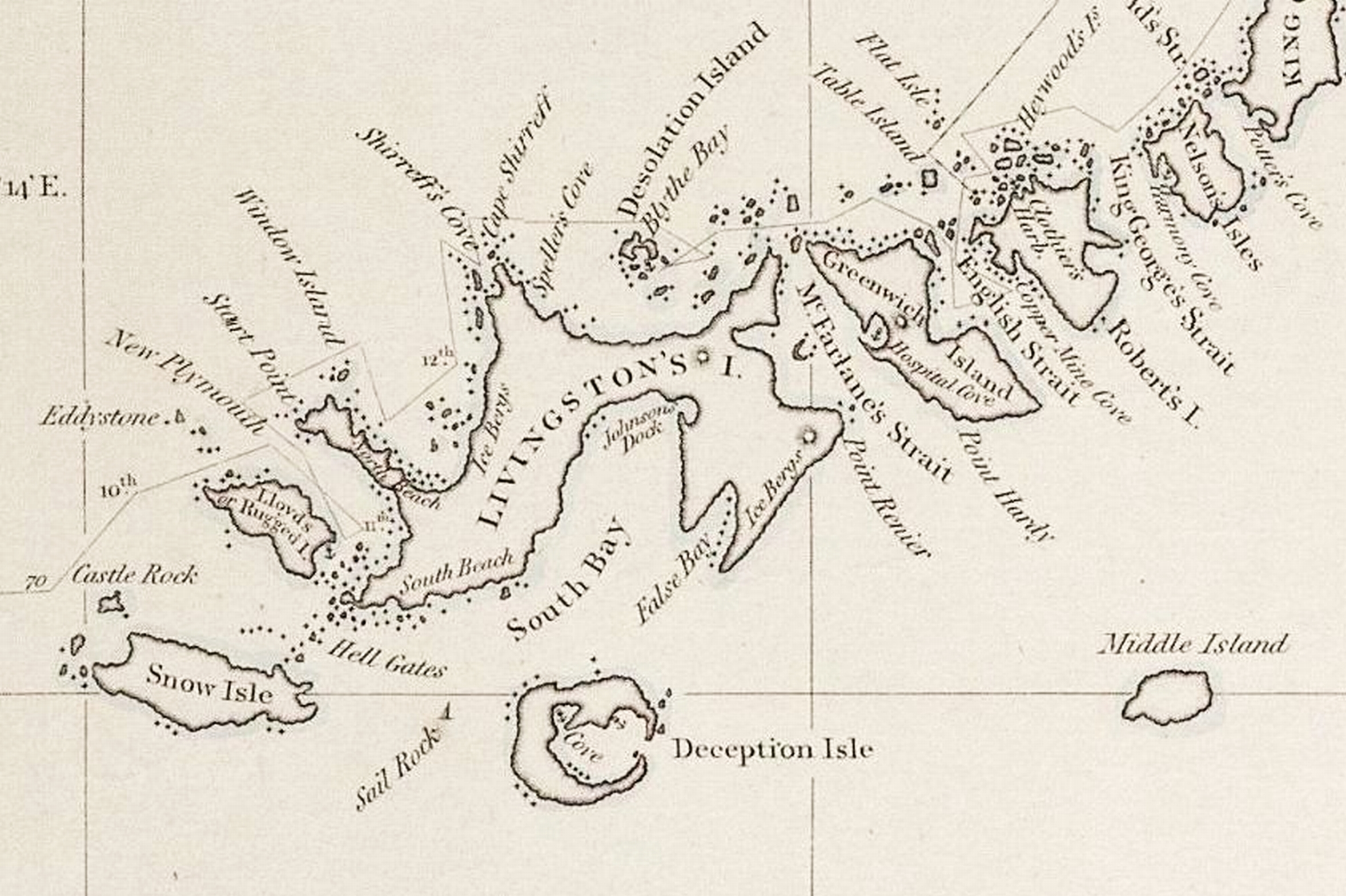
Fragment of George Powell's 1822 chart of the South Shetland Islands and South Orkney Islands featuring Sail Rock

Sail Rock is the remaining uppermost part of a submerged volcanic edifice lying 7 nautical miles (13 km) southwest of Deception Island in the South Shetland Islands, Antarctica. It is 20 m long in southwest-northeast direction, 12 m wide and 30 m high. From a distance, the rock is reported to resemble a ship under sail, but at close range it is more like a house with a gable roof. The feature's name, which dates back to at least 1822, was probably given by sealers.

== Location ==
The rock is located at 63°2′56.5″S 60°57′32.4″W, 7 nautical miles southwest of Deception Island.

== Geology ==
Sail Rock is actually a volcano, or rather, part of one. The rock is a 30 meter jut-up of an undersea volcano lying just beneath the water. It also contains no glass according to rock samples.

== In Popular Media ==
On April 29, 2016, YouTuber "Wowforreeel" uploaded a video titled "Massive unknown creature near Antarctica?", in which a camera zooms in on Deception Island and Sail Rock on Google Earth. The YouTuber includes commentary and images that suggest that Sail Rock is a giant sea creature, specifically the mythical Kraken. The angle the rock was pictured on Google does give it a (at least minor) resemblance to the fin and upper mantle of a squid. This is (probably) the event that kicked off the Kraken fad with Sail Rock.

This ultimately spiraled into many other Google Earth and mystery YouTube channels making videos including Sail Rock and further suggesting that the formation was evidence of the giant, legendary mollusk. On the other hand, many news outlets also reported on the "disturbing" finding, but usually ended with clarification that Sail Rock was not, in fact, the terror of North Atlantic legend. Such news outlets include Yahoo! News and the News Corp Australia Network.

== Maps ==
- Chart of South Shetland including Coronation Island, &c. from the exploration of the sloop Dove in the years 1821 and 1822 by George Powell Commander of the same. Scale ca. 1:200000. London: Laurie, 1822
- South Shetland Islands: Deception Island. Scale 1:50000 map. Insets: Sail Rock 1:10000. UK Antarctic Place-names Committee, 2010
- Antarctic Digital Database (ADD). Scale 1:250000 topographic map of Antarctica. Scientific Committee on Antarctic Research (SCAR). Since 1993, regularly updated
