= Charcot plate =

Fragment of the Phoenix tectonic plate fused to the Antarctic Peninsula

The Charcot plate was a fragment of the Phoenix plate. The subduction of the Charcot plate, beneath West Antarctica, stopped before 83 Ma, and became fused onto the Antarctic Peninsula. Researchers have suggested that there are remnants of the western part of the Charcot plate in the Bellingshausen Sea.
