= Antarctic–Phoenix Ridge =

Ancient mid-ocean ridge between the Phoenix and Pacific plates

Coordinates: 59°37′18″S 59°37′18″W

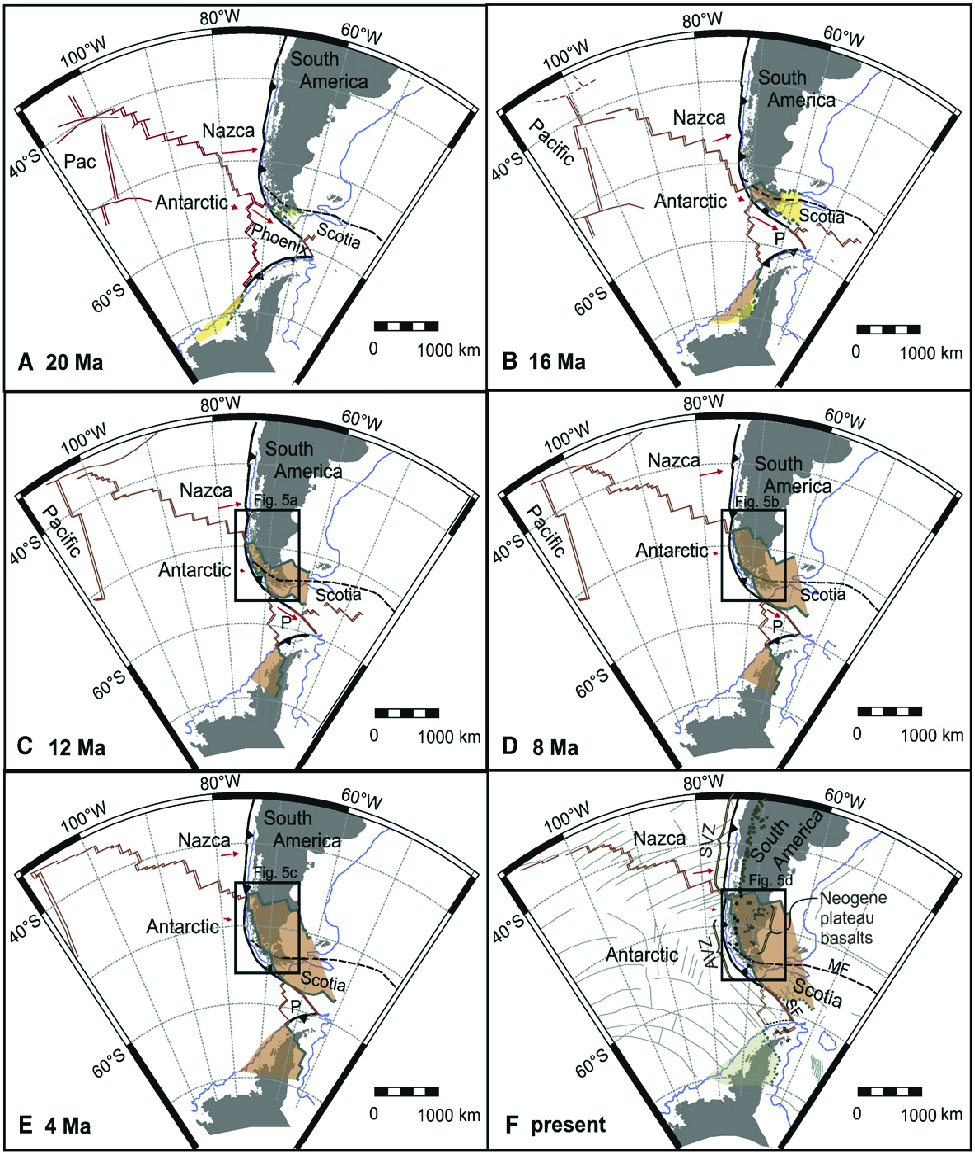
The small remaining piece of the ridge can be seen in the bottom right (present day) image.

The Antarctic–Phoenix Ridge, also called the Phoenix Ridge, is an extinct mid-ocean ridge that consisted of three spreading ridge segments between the Antarctic Peninsula and the Scotia Sea. It initiated during the Late Cretaceous–Early Tertiary when the Phoenix plate had divergent boundaries with the Bellingshausen and Pacific plates. Spreading along the Antarctic–Phoenix Ridge had ceased entirely by 3.3 million years ago when the small remnant of the Phoenix Plate was incorporated into the Antarctic Plate.

== See also ==
- List of oceanic ridges
