= South Shetland Trough =

Antarctic undersea trough

Coordinates: 61°0′S 59°30′W

Location of the South Shetland Trough

The South Shetland Trough is an undersea trough located north of the South Shetland Islands, which are a group of Antarctic islands. It is the remnant of a subduction zone where the defunct Phoenix Plate, now part of the Antarctic Plate, subducted under the Antarctic Peninsula and the South Shetland Islands.
