= Penguin Island (South Shetland Islands) =

Small island of the South Shetland Islands of Antarctica

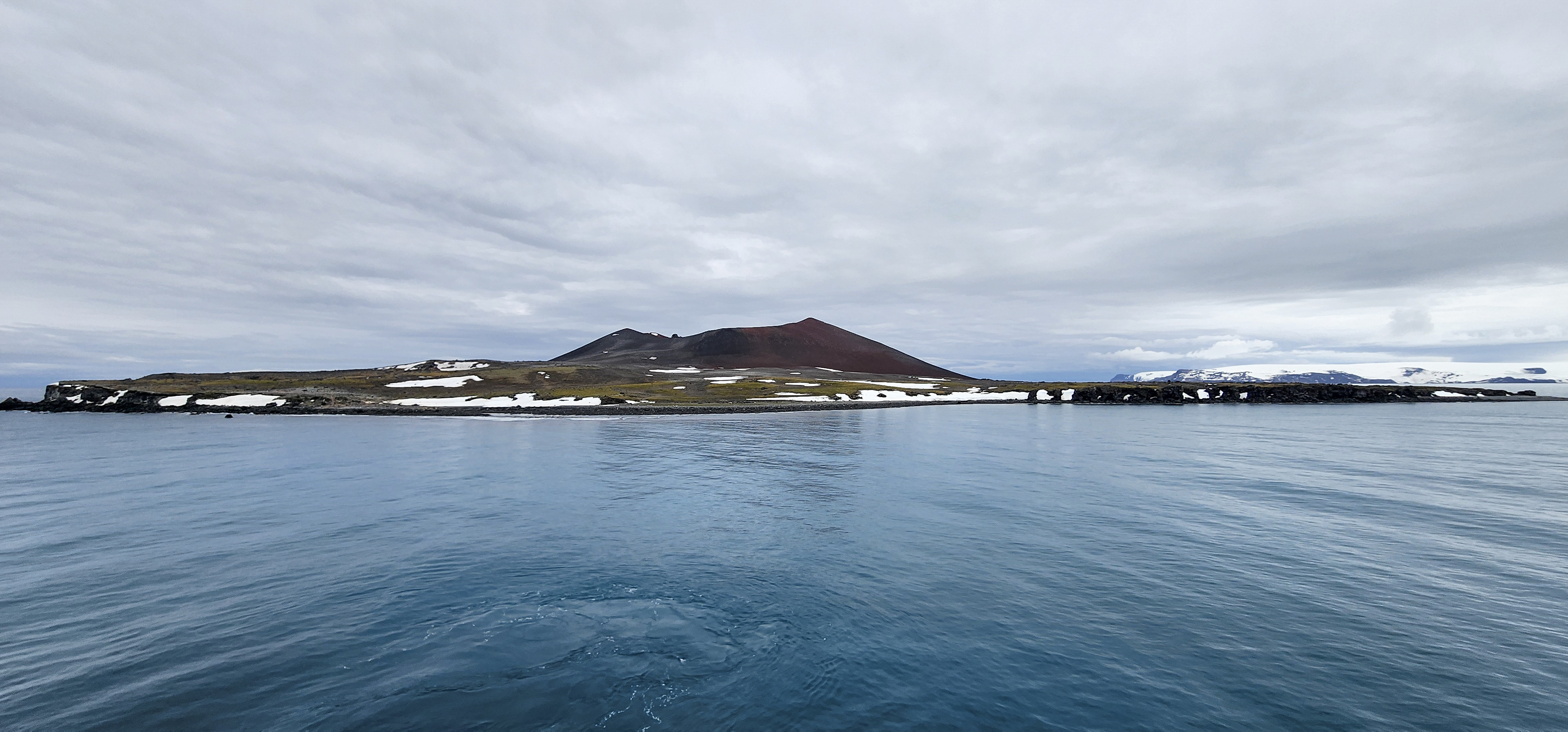
- Penguin Island in 2024

- Location within Antarctic Peninsula Location within Antarctica

Geography
- Location: Antarctica
- Coordinates: 62°06′00″S 57°55′41″W
- Length: 1.7 km (1.06 mi)
- Width: 1.4 km (0.87 mi)
- Highest elevation: 180 m (590 ft)
- Highest point: Deacon Peak

Administration
- Administered under the Antarctic Treaty System

Demographics
- Population: Uninhabited

Penguin Island

Highest point
- Elevation: 180 m (590 ft)
- Coordinates: 62°06′S 57°56′W

Geography
- Location: Antarctica
- Topo map: USGS

Geology
- Mountain type: Stratovolcano
- Last eruption: 1905 (?)

Penguin Island (also known as Georges Island, Île Pingouin, Isla Pingüino, and Penguin Isle) is one of the smaller of the South Shetland Islands of Antarctica.

== History ==
Penguin Island was sighted in January 1820 by a British expedition under Edward Bransfield, and so named by him because great auks (that were called penguins at the time) occupied the shores of the island.

== Description ==
The island, which is ice-free and oval shaped, 1.4 km (0.87 mi) wide by 1.7 km (1.1 mi) long, lies close off the south coast of the much larger King George Island, and marks the eastern side of the entrance to King George Bay. It has a shoreline of low cliffs, with a beach on the north coast providing access. There is a small lake in the north-east. It is capped by Deacon Peak, a basaltic scoria cone. Deacon Peak was last thought to be active about 300 years ago. Petrel Crater, a maar crater, is located on the east side of the island, and is thought to have last erupted in or around 1905.

== Geology ==
The island is the top of a Pleistocene-Recent stratovolcano within the Bransfield Basin. The volcano has a base diameter of 8 km, and a height of 350 m. Penguin island is the top third of the volcano. The crater is approximately 150 meters deep and is found above the vent of the volcano. There are two small black volcanic plugs visible in the red cinder cone crater. The Holocene volcano is related to the Shetland subduction zone north of the volcano.

== Important Bird Area ==
The island has been identified as an Important Bird Area (IBA) by BirdLife International because it supports a wide range of seabirds including a breeding colony of over 600 pairs of southern giant petrels. Other birds nesting at the site include Adélie and chinstrap penguins, Antarctic terns and kelp gulls. Weddell and southern elephant seals regularly haul out.

== See also ==
- List of Antarctic and subantarctic islands
- List of volcanoes in Antarctica
