= Hero fracture zone =

Geologic region near Antarctica

The Hero fracture zone (61°30′S 66°0′W) is an undersea fracture zone in the Antarctic. Its name was approved by the Advisory Committee on Undersea Features in June 1987.

== See also ==
- Hero (sloop)
