= Bellingshausen plate =

Ancient tectonic plate that fused onto the Antarctic plate

The Bellingshausen plate was an ancient tectonic plate that fused onto the Antarctic plate. It is named after Fabian Gottlieb von Bellingshausen, the Russian discoverer of Antarctica. The plate was in existence during the Late Cretaceous epoch and Paleogene period, and it was adjacent to eastern Marie Byrd Land. Independent plate motion ceased at 61 million years ago. The boundaries are poorly defined.
