= South Georgia and the South Sandwich Islands =

British Overseas Territory in the South Atlantic

- British Overseas Territory
- Flag Coat of arms
- Motto: Leo terram propriam protegat (Latin) "Let the lion protect his own land"
- Anthem: "God Save the King"
- Location of South Georgia and the South Sandwich Islands in the southern Atlantic Ocean
- Sovereignty: United Kingdom
- Separation from Falkland Islands: 3 October 1985
- Capital and largest settlement: King Edward Point; 54°17′00″S 36°30′00″W
- Official languages: English
- Demonym(s): South Georgian; South Sandwich Islander
- Government: Directly administered dependency under a constitutional monarchy
  - Monarch: Charles III
  - Commissioner: Colin Martin-Reynolds

Government of the United Kingdom
  - Minister: Uma Kumaran

Area
  - Total: 3,903 km^{2} (1,507 sq mi)

Population
  - 2020 estimate: 22 (summer), 19 (winter)
- Currency: Pound sterling Falkland Islands pound (£) (FKP)
- Time zone: UTC−02:00
- Date format: dd/mm/yyyy
- Driving side: Left
- Calling code: +500
- UK postcode: SIQQ 1xx
- ISO 3166 code: GS
- Internet TLD: .gs
- Website: www.gov.gs

South Georgia and the South Sandwich Islands (SGSSI) is a British Overseas Territory in the southern Atlantic Ocean. It is a remote and inhospitable collection of islands, consisting of South Georgia and a chain of smaller islands known as the South Sandwich Islands. South Georgia is 165 kilometres (103 mi) long and 35 kilometres (22 mi) wide and is by far the largest island in the territory. The South Sandwich Islands lie about 700 kilometres (430 mi) southeast of South Georgia. The territory's total land area is 3,903 km^{2} (1,507 sq mi). The Falkland Islands are about 1,300 kilometres (810 mi) west from its nearest point.

The South Sandwich Islands are uninhabited, and a very small, non-permanent population resides on South Georgia. There are no scheduled passenger flights or ferries to or from the territory, although visits by cruise liners to South Georgia are increasingly popular, with several thousand visitors each summer.

The United Kingdom claimed sovereignty over South Georgia in 1775 and the South Sandwich Islands in 1908. The territory of "South Georgia and the South Sandwich Islands" was formed in 1985; previously, it had been governed as part of the Falkland Islands Dependencies. Argentina claimed South Georgia in 1927 and claimed the South Sandwich Islands in 1938.

Argentina maintained a naval station, Corbeta Uruguay, on Thule Island in the South Sandwich Islands from 1976 until 1982 when it was closed by the Royal Navy. The Argentine claim over South Georgia contributed to the 1982 Falklands War, during which Argentine forces briefly occupied the island. Argentina continues to claim sovereignty over South Georgia and the South Sandwich Islands as part of the Province of Tierra del Fuego, Antarctica and South Atlantic Islands.

== History ==
=== South Georgia ===
==== 17th to 19th centuries ====
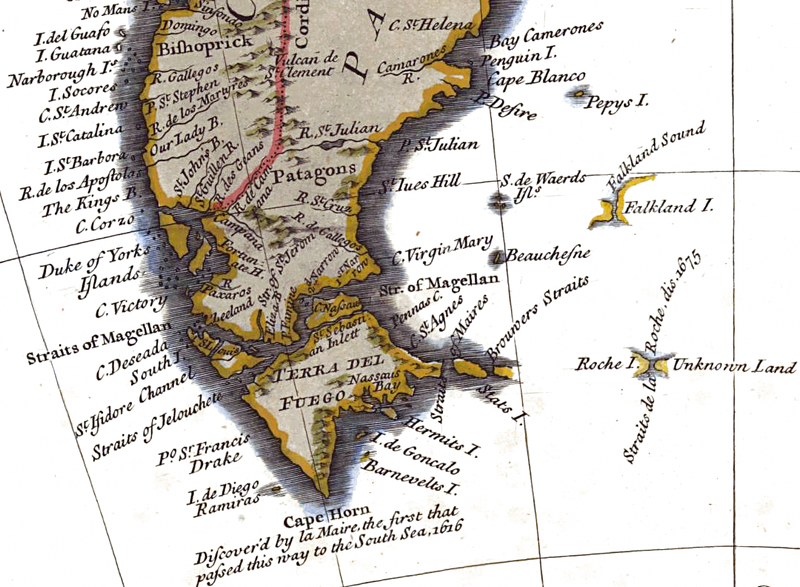
Richard William Seale's map of 1744, showing Roche Island and noting its discovery in 1675

The island of South Georgia was first sighted and visited in April 1675 by Anthony de la Roché, a London merchant and (despite his French name) an Englishman, who spent a fortnight in one of the island's bays. The island appeared as Roche Island on early maps. The commercial Spanish ship León, operating out of Saint-Malo, sighted it on 28 June or 29 June 1756.

James Cook circumnavigated the island in 1775 and made the first landing. He claimed the territory for the Kingdom of Great Britain, naming it the "Isle of Georgia" in honour of King George III. British arrangements for the government of South Georgia were established under 1843 British letters patent.

In 1882–1883 a German expedition for the first International Polar Year set up its base at Royal Bay on the southeast side of the island. The scientists of this group observed the transit of Venus and recorded waves produced by the 1883 eruption of Krakatoa. Seal hunting at South Georgia began in 1786 and continued throughout the 19th century. The waters proved treacherous and a number of vessels were wrecked there, such as Earl Spencer, in late 1801.

==== 20th and 21st centuries ====
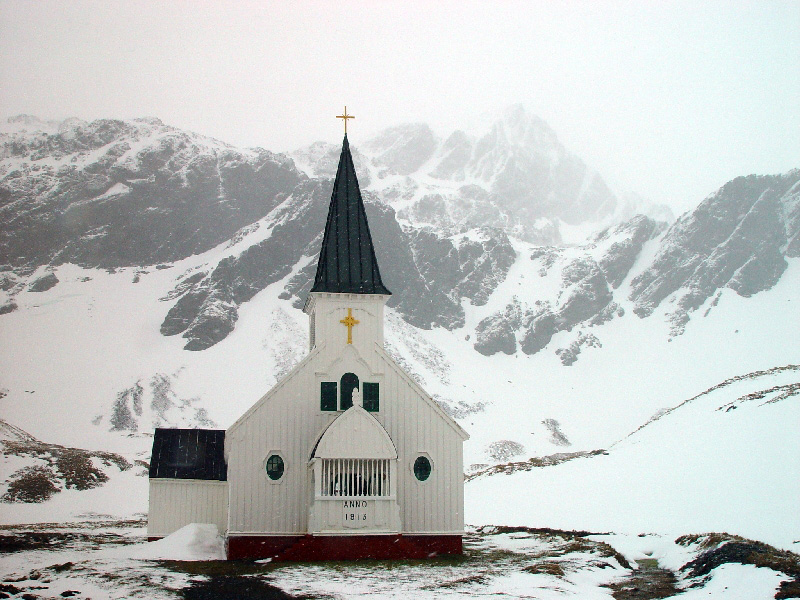
Norwegian Anglican Church at Grytviken, formerly the Norwegian Lutheran Church

South Georgia became a base for whaling beginning in the 20th century. A Norwegian, Carl Anton Larsen, established the first land-based whaling station and first permanent habitation at Grytviken in 1904. It operated through his Argentine Fishing Company, which settled in Grytviken. The station operated until 1965. Whaling stations operated under leases granted by the Governor of the Falkland Islands. The seven stations, all on the north coast with its sheltered harbours, were, from the west to east:

1. Prince Olav Harbour
2. Leith Harbour
3. Stromness
4. Husvik
5. Grytviken
6. Godthul
7. Ocean Harbour

The whaling stations' tryworks were unpleasant and dangerous places to work. One was called "a charnel house boiling wholesale in Vaseline" by an early 20th-century visitor. Tim Flannery wrote that its "putrid vapors [resembled] the pong of bad fish, manure, and a tanning works mixed together", and noted one bizarre peril: "A rotting whale could fill with gas to bursting, ejecting a fetus the size of a motor vehicle with sufficient force to kill a man."

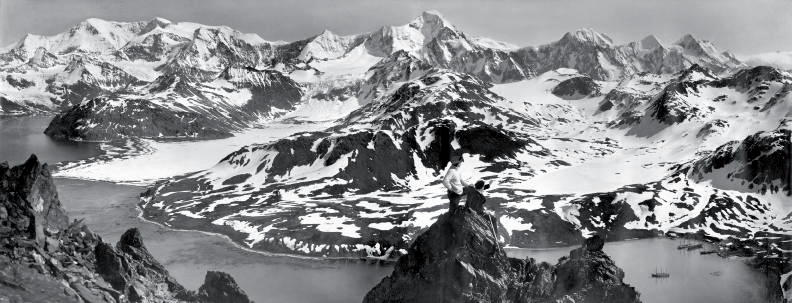
South Georgia, photographed by Frank Hurley during the Imperial Trans-Antarctic Expedition

With the end of the whaling industry, the stations were abandoned. Apart from a few preserved buildings such as the South Georgia Museum and Norwegian Lutheran Church at Grytviken, only their decaying remains survive. From 1905, the Argentine Meteorological Office cooperated in maintaining a meteorological observatory at Grytviken under the British lease requirements of the whaling station until these changed in 1949.

In 1908, the United Kingdom issued further letters patent that established constitutional arrangements for its possessions in the South Atlantic. The letters covered South Georgia, the South Orkneys, the South Shetlands, the South Sandwich Islands, and Graham Land. The claim was extended in 1917 to include a sector of Antarctica reaching to the South Pole. In 1909, an administrative centre and residence were established at King Edward Point on South Georgia, near the whaling station of Grytviken. A permanent local British administration and resident magistrate exercised effective possession, enforcement of British law, and regulation of all economic, scientific, and other activities in the territory, which was then governed as the Falkland Islands Dependencies. In about 1912, what is according to some accounts the largest whale ever caught, a blue whale of 110 feet (34 m), was landed at Grytviken.

In April 1916, Ernest Shackleton's Imperial Trans-Antarctic Expedition became stranded on Elephant Island, some 800 miles (1,300 km) southwest of South Georgia. Shackleton and five companions set out in a small boat to summon help, and on 10 May, after an epic voyage, they landed at King Haakon Bay on South Georgia's south coast. While three stayed at the coast, Shackleton and the two others, Tom Crean and Frank Worsley, went on to cover 22 miles (35 km) over the spine of the mountainous island to reach help at Stromness whaling station. The remaining 22 members of the expedition, who had stayed on Elephant Island, were subsequently rescued. In January 1922, during a later expedition, Shackleton died on board ship while moored in King Edward Cove, South Georgia. He is buried at Grytviken. The ashes of another noted Antarctic explorer, Frank Wild, who had been Shackleton's second-in-command on the Imperial Trans-Antarctic Expedition, were interred next to Shackleton in 2011.

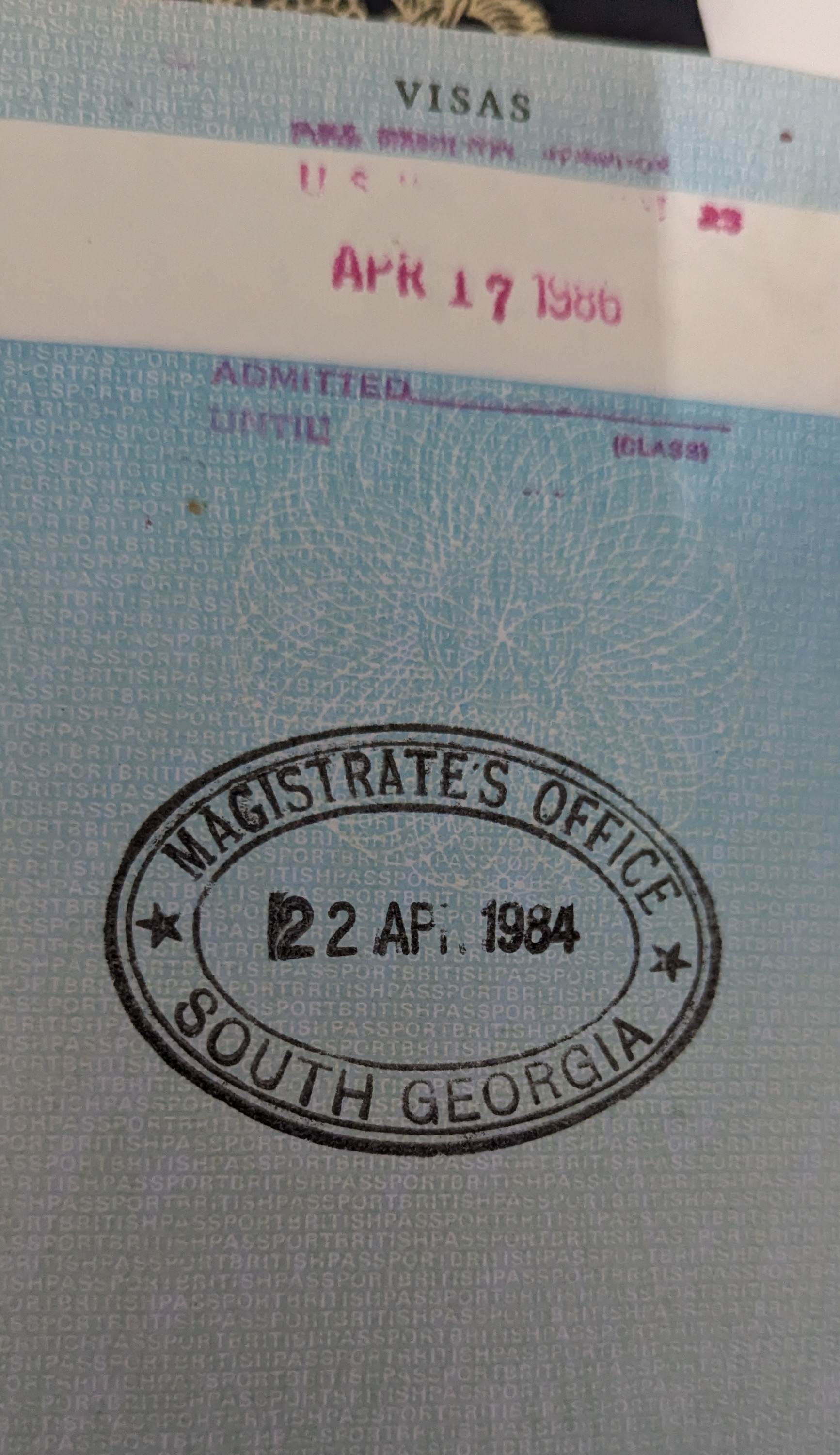
South Georgia passport entry stamp, issued at the Post Office in Grytviken 1984

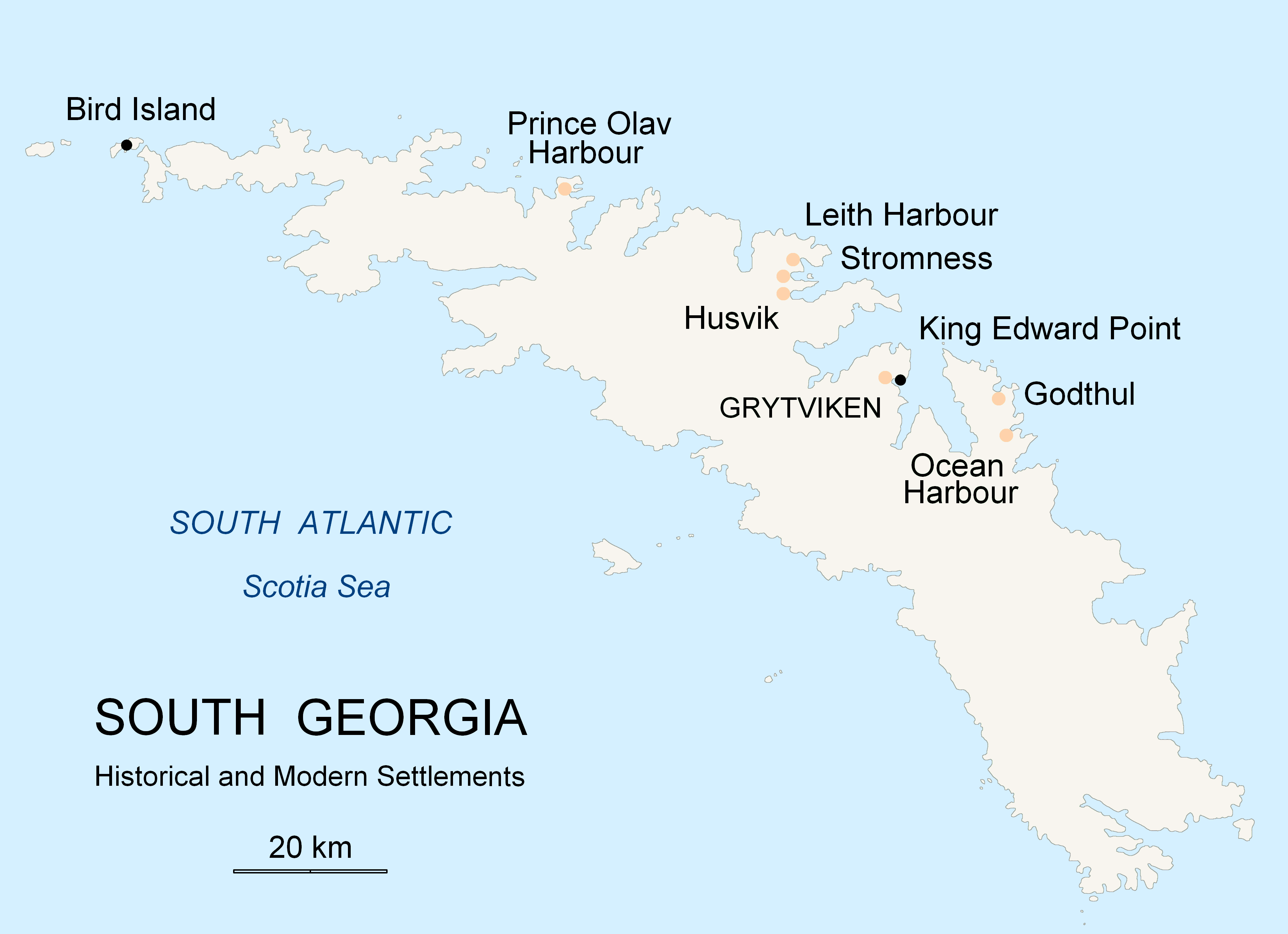
Historical and modern settlements of South Georgia Island

Argentina claimed South Georgia in 1927. The basis of this claim and of a later claim in 1938 to the South Sandwich Islands has been questioned. During the Second World War, the Royal Navy deployed an armed merchant vessel to patrol South Georgian and Antarctic waters against German raiders, along with two four-inch shore guns (still present) protecting Cumberland Bay and Stromness Bay, which were operated by volunteers from among the Norwegian whalers. The base at King Edward Point was expanded as a research facility in 1949–1950 by the British Antarctic Survey, which until 1962 was called the Falkland Islands Dependencies Survey.

The Falklands War was precipitated on 19 March 1982 when a group of Argentinians (most of them Argentine Marines in mufti), posing as scrap-metal merchants, occupied the abandoned whaling station at Leith Harbour on South Georgia. On 3 April, Argentine troops attacked and occupied Grytviken. Among the commanding officers of the Argentine garrison was Alfredo Astiz, a captain in the Argentine Navy who was convicted years later of crimes against humanity committed during the Dirty War in Argentina. The island was recaptured by British forces on 25 April, in Operation Paraquet.

In 1985, South Georgia and the South Sandwich Islands ceased to be administered as a Falkland Islands Dependency and became a separate territory. The King Edward Point base, which had become a small military garrison after the Falklands War, returned to civilian use in 2001 and is now operated by the British Antarctic Survey.

=== South Sandwich Islands ===
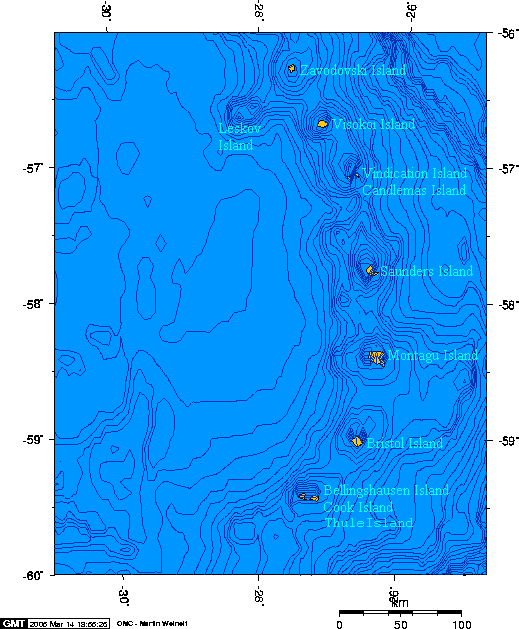
Map of the South Sandwich Islands.

Captain James Cook discovered the southern eight islands of the Sandwich Islands Group in 1775, although he lumped the southernmost three together, and their status as separate islands was not established until 1820 by Fabian Gottlieb von Bellingshausen. The northern three islands were discovered by Bellingshausen in 1819. The islands were tentatively named "Sandwich Land" by Cook, although he also commented that they might be a group of islands rather than a single body of land. The name was chosen in honour of John Montagu, 4th Earl of Sandwich, who was First Lord of the Admiralty. The word "South" was later added to distinguish them from the "Sandwich Islands", now known as the Hawaiian Islands.

Southern Thule, at the south end of the island chain, is the southernmost land on Earth outside the area covered by the Antarctic Treaty.

Argentina claimed the South Sandwich Islands in 1938, and challenged British sovereignty in the Islands on several occasions. From 25 January 1955 to mid-1956, Argentina maintained the summer station, "Teniente Esquivel" (es) at Ferguson Bay on the southeastern coast of Thule Island. Argentina maintained a naval base (Corbeta Uruguay) from 1976 to 1982, in the lee (southern east coast) of the same island. Although the British discovered the presence of the Argentine base in 1976, protested and tried to resolve the issue by diplomatic means, no effort was made to remove them by force until after the Falklands War. The base was removed on 20 June 1982.

== Languages ==
The sole official language of the territory is English, which is widely spoken amongst residents currently and used for nearly all administrative functions in the territory. Although English is used in the majority of government functions, the islands' motto Leo Terram Propriam Protegat is in Latin and is translated as "May the Lion protect his own land". The adoption of new placenames was governed by the Place-names Ordinance of 1956 and Place-names Regulation of 1957 until 11 September 2020, when a representative was appointed to the regional Antarctic Place-names Committee and a new list of three criteria was created for deciding new names within the territory.

During British captain James Cook's navigation of the islands, he set a standard for the adoption of new names in the territory based on four categories: expedition sponsors, the names of officers and crew, notable contemporary events, and descriptive names referring to the physical nature of the place or geographic formation. This standard was mostly followed by later visitors in the region, including by explorers from different countries, such as Russian explorer Fabian Gottlieb von Bellingshausen, who selected six new names within the territory in his 1819–1821 Antarctic expedition.

Locations currently bearing names selected by Cook include Clerke Rocks, Possession Bay, and Bay of Isles, amongst others. Additional English names given many years after in recognition of past visits by American whalers in the territory include Morrell Point, Wasp Point, Pacific Point, and Comer Crag. Prominent Russian-language names chosen by Bellingshausen include the Traversay Islands, Zavodovski Island, and Visokoi Island (высокий meaning "high"). There is also a Lowland Scots language presence within the topography of the territory, with some locations being named after notable Scottish individuals, such as Geikie Glacier and Allardyce Range, amongst others.

A number of placenames were influenced by the historical presence of Norwegian whalers, including Hestesletten ("horse's plain"), Skrap Skerries ("skrapskjaer" or "skrapskjar"), Grytviken ("Pot Bay"), and Elsehul ("Else's hole"), as well as a few whaling stations such as Godthul ("good hollow"). The first person to be born in South Georgia (and south of the Antarctic Convergence), Solveig Gunbjørg Jacobsen, was also Norwegian. The small cove Maiviken, located in the Thatcher peninsula, was originally given the Swedish name Majviken meaning "May Bay" but was later altered into its current Norwegian spelling. In addition, numerous German placenames were also adopted in recognition of the German International Polar Year Expedition of 1882–1883 and an earlier American whaling voyage in 1877–1878 carrying Austrian painter Heinrich Klutschak, with Klutschak Point and Schrader Glacier commemorating the two trips.

There has been a Spanish language presence in the territory for a significant amount of time, with the whaling company Compañía Argentina de Pesca operating in the territory for approximately 60 years. However, there are relatively few Spanish names within the territory currently, in part due to ongoing sovereignty dispute over the islands by Argentina, although since the beginning of Argentine Antarctic Expeditions in 1952, a number of locations have been given Spanish names, including Punta Carbón and Punta Hueca. An Argentine naval station called Corbeta Uruguay was clandestinely built on Thule Island, South Sandwich Islands, on 7 November 1976 before its abandonment by Argentine forces following their defeat in the Falklands War.

== Geography ==
Map of the islands

South Georgia and the South Sandwich Islands are a collection of islands in the South Atlantic Ocean. Most of the islands, rising steeply from the sea, are rugged and mountainous. At higher elevations, the islands are permanently covered with ice and snow.

=== South Georgia Group ===
The South Georgia Group lies about 1,390 kilometres (860 mi; 750 nmi) east-southeast of the Falkland Islands, at 54°–55°S, 36°–38°W. It comprises South Georgia Island itself, by far the largest island in the territory, and the islands that immediately surround it and some remote and isolated islets to the west and east-southeast. It has a total land area of 3,756 square kilometres (1,450 sq mi), including satellite islands, but excluding the South Sandwich Islands which form a separate island group.

==== Islands within the South Georgia Group ====
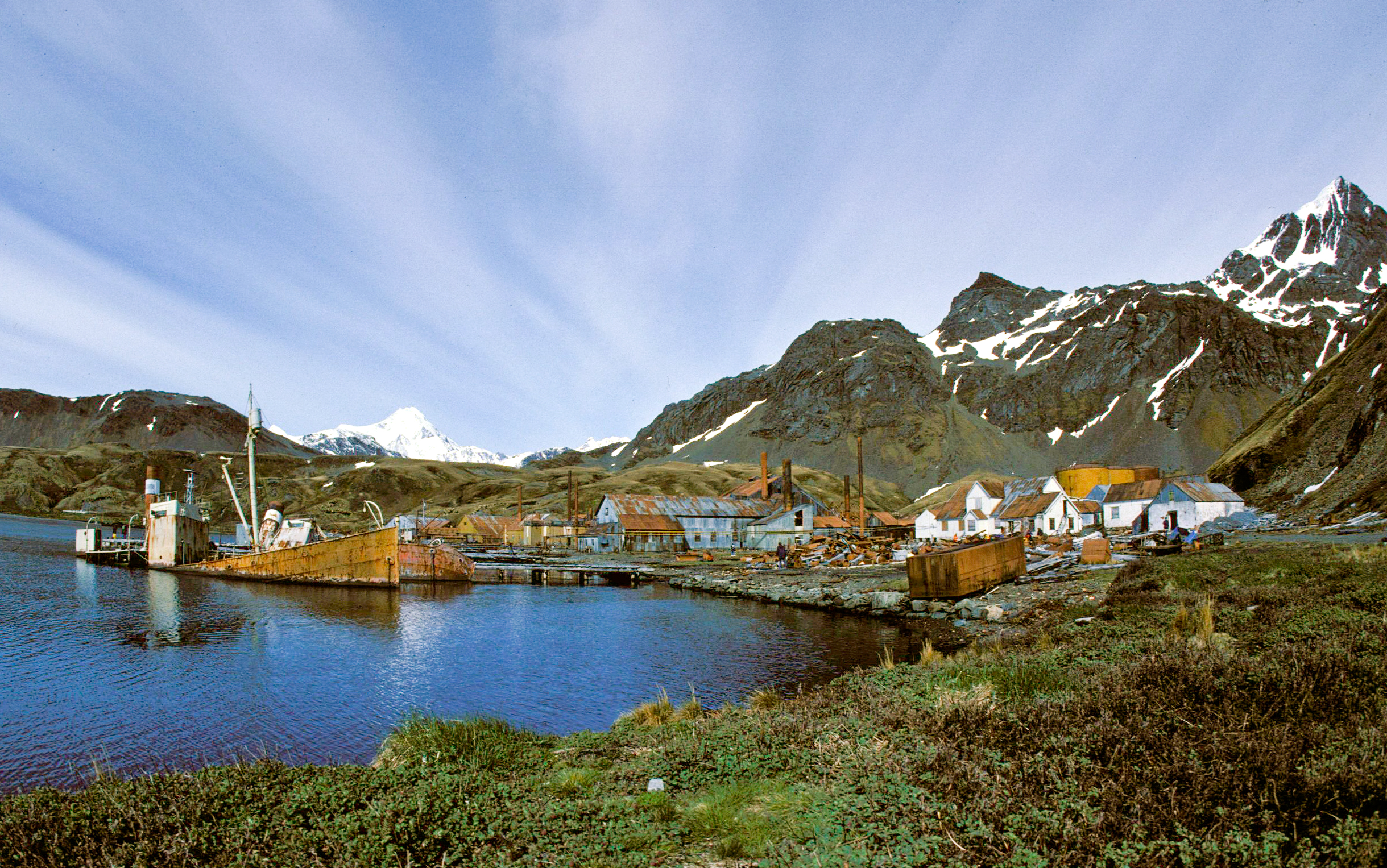
Grytviken

South Georgia Island lies at 54°15′S 36°45′W and has an area of 3,528 square kilometres (1,362 sq mi). It is mountainous and largely barren. Eleven peaks rise to over 2,000 metres (6,600 ft) high, their slopes furrowed with deep gorges filled with glaciers; the largest is Fortuna Glacier. The highest peak is Mount Paget in the Allardyce Range at 2,934 metres (9,626 ft).

Geologically, the island consists of gneiss and argillaceous schists with occasional tuffs and other sedimentary layers from which fossils have been recovered. The island is a fragment of some greater land-mass now vanished and was probably a former extension of the Andean system.

Smaller islands and islets off the coast of South Georgia Island include:

- Annenkov Island
- Bird Island
- Cooper Island
- Grass Island
- Jomfruene
- Pickersgill Islands
- Trinity Island
- Welcome Islands
- Willis Islands

These remote rocks are also considered part of the South Georgia Group:

- Shag Rocks, 185 km (115 mi; 100 nmi) west-northwest of South Georgia Island
- Black Rock, 169 km (105 mi; 91 nmi) west-northwest of South Georgia Island
- Clerke Rocks, 56 km (35 mi; 30 nmi) east-southeast of South Georgia Island

=== South Sandwich Islands ===
Closeup map of the South Sandwich Islands

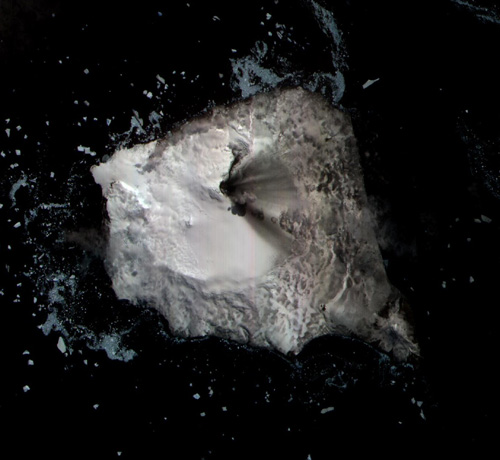
NASA satellite photograph of Montagu Island

The South Sandwich Islands comprise 11 mostly volcanic islands (excluding tiny satellite islands and offshore rocks), with some active volcanoes. They form an island arc running north–south in the region 56°18'–59°27'S, 26°23'–28°08'W, between about 350 and 500 mi (300 and 430 nmi; 560 and 800 km) southeast of South Georgia. The archipelago comprises Candlemas, Vindication, Saunders, Montagu, Bristol, Bellingshausen, Cook and Thule discovered by Cook.

The northernmost of the South Sandwich Islands form the Traversay Islands and Candlemas Islands groups, while the southernmost make up Southern Thule. The three largest islands – Saunders, Montagu, and Bristol – lie between the two. The islands' highest point is Mount Belinda (1,370 m or 4,495 ft) on Montagu Island. The fourth highest peak, Mount Michael (990 m or 3,248 ft) on Saunders Island has a persistent lava lake, known to occur at only eight volcanoes in the world.

The South Sandwich Islands are uninhabited, though a permanently staffed Argentine research station was located on Thule Island from 1976 to 1982. Automatic weather stations are on Thule Island and Zavodovski. To the northwest of Zavodovski Island is the Protector Shoal, a submarine volcano.

=== Extreme points ===
- Northernmost point – Cape North
- Southernmost point – on Cook Island
- Westernmost point – on Main Island (of the Willis Islands)
- Easternmost point – on Montagu Island
- Highest point – Mount Paget: 2,934 m
- Lowest point – Atlantic Ocean: 0

== Climate ==
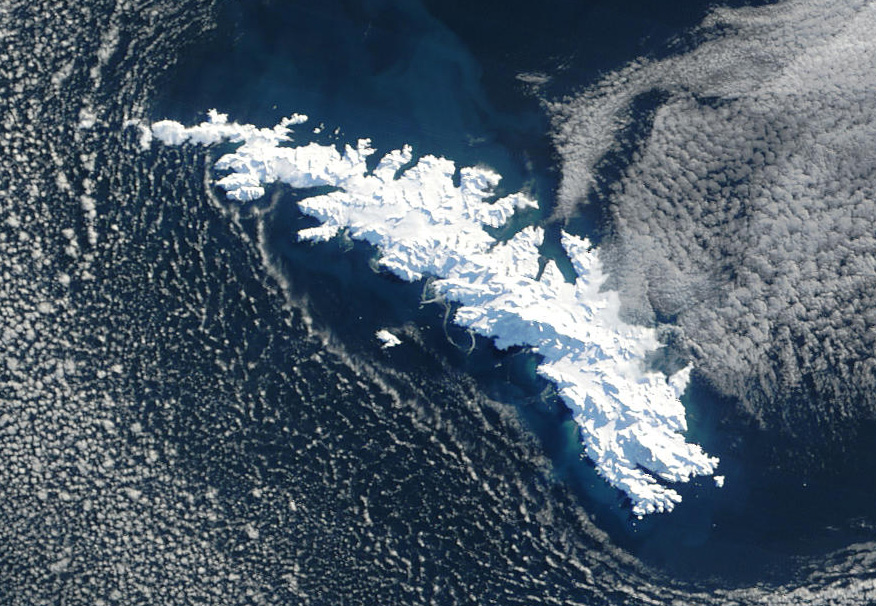
NASA satellite image of South Georgia Island covered with snow

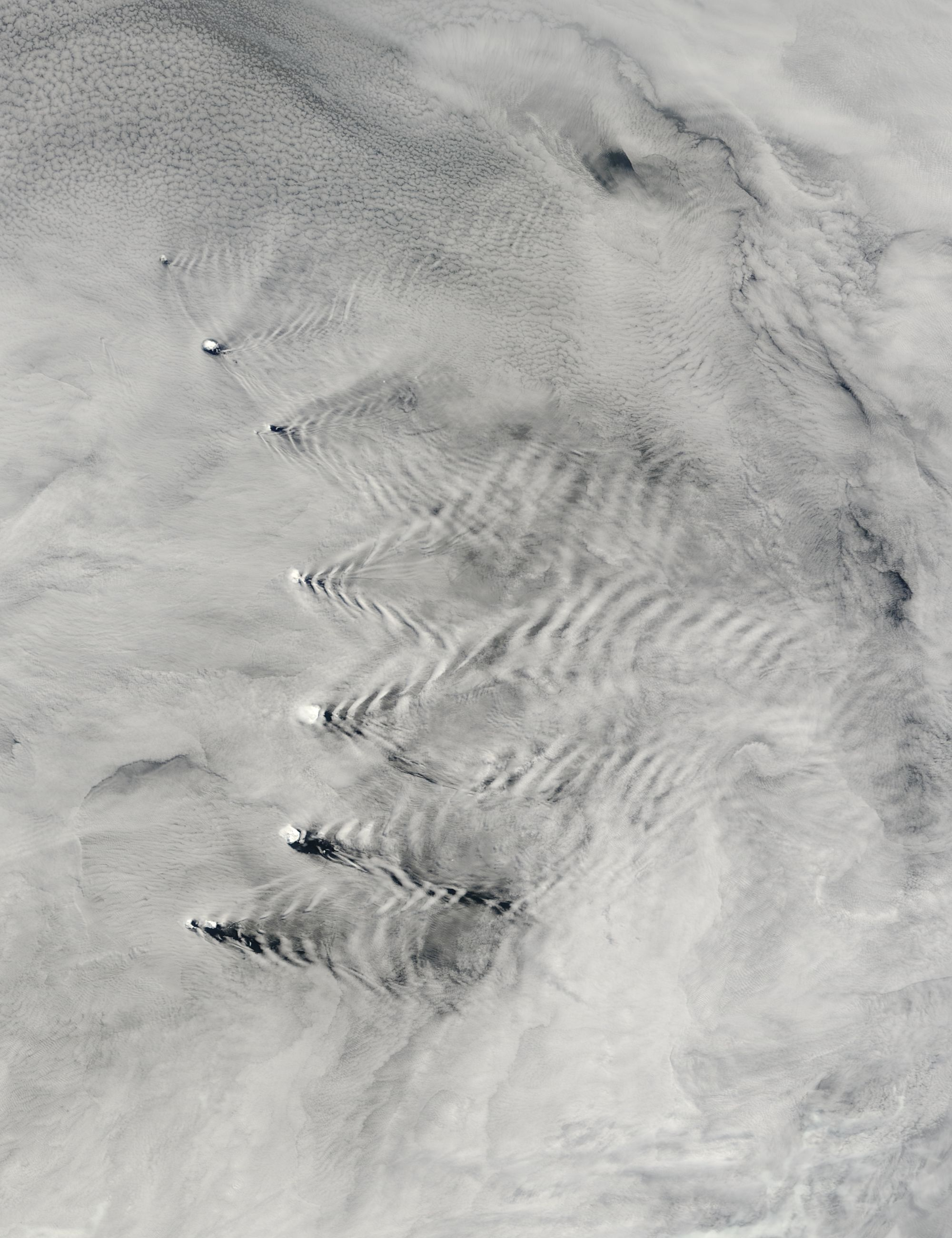
The South Sandwich Islands interact with air currents to make wave patterns in clouds.

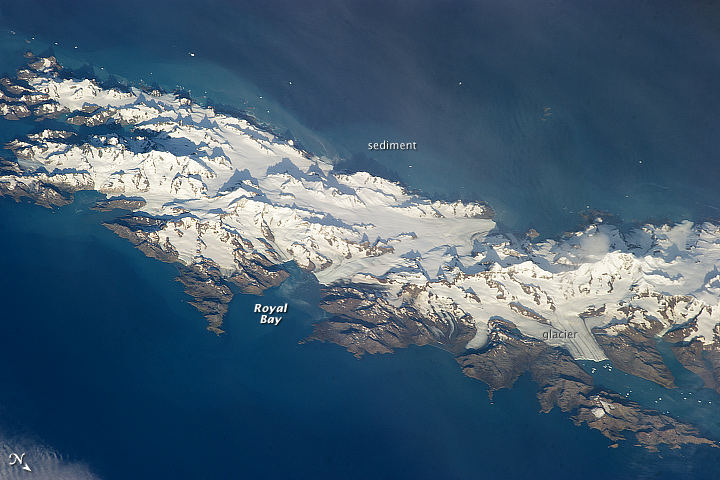
Royal Bay and South Georgia Island (south-up image)

The climate is classified as polar, and the weather is highly variable and harsh, making a tundra (ET) in Köppen climate classification. Typical daily maximum temperatures in South Georgia at sea level are around 0 °C (32 °F) in winter (August) and 8 °C (46.4 °F) in summer (January). Winter minimum temperatures are typically about −5 °C (23 °F) and rarely dip below −10 °C (14 °F). Annual precipitation in South Georgia is about 1,500 mm (59.1 in), much of which falls as sleet or snow, which is possible the entire year. Inland, the snow line in summer is at an altitude of about 300 m (984 ft).

Westerly winds blow throughout the year interspersed with periods of calm—indeed, in 1963, 25% of winds were in the calm category at King Edward Point, and the mean wind speed of around 8 knots (9.2 mph; 15 km/h) is around half that of the Falkland Islands. This gives the eastern side of South Georgia (leeward side) a more pleasant climate than the exposed western side. The prevailing weather conditions generally make the islands difficult to approach by ship, though the north coast of South Georgia has several large bays which provide good anchorage.

Sunshine, as with many South Atlantic Islands, is low, at a maximum of just 21.5%. This amounts to around 1,000 hours of sunshine annually. The local topography, however, also contributes significantly to the low insolation. A study published during the early 1960s indicated that sunshine recording instruments remained significantly obscured throughout the year and entirely obscured during June. It was estimated that the theoretical sunshine exposure minus obstructions would be around 14% at Bird Island and 35% at King Edward Point – or, in hourly terms, ranging from around 650 hours in the west to 1,500 hours in the east. This illustrates the effect the Allardyce Range has in breaking up cloud cover.

Mountain winds rise over the western slopes of the mountains of South Georgia and down the eastern side and become much warmer and drier due to the Föhn effect; this produces the most pleasant conditions when temperatures can occasionally rise to over 20 °C (68 °F) on summer days. The highest temperature recorded at the King Edward Point meteorological station (often generically and less accurately called Grytviken) on the sheltered eastern side of South Georgia is 28.8 °C (83.8 °F). Conversely, the highest recorded temperature at Bird Island on the windward western side is a mere 14.5 °C (58.1 °F). As one might expect, the sheltered eastern side can also record lower winter temperatures—the absolute minimum temperature for King Edward Point is −19.4 °C (−2.9 °F), but Bird Island just −11.4 °C (11.5 °F).

The seas surrounding South Georgia are cold throughout the year due to the proximity of the Antarctic Circumpolar Current. They usually remain free of pack ice in winter, though thin ice may form in sheltered bays, and icebergs are common. Sea temperatures drop to 0 °C (32 °F) in late August and rise to around 4 °C (39.2 °F) only in early April.

The South Sandwich Islands are much colder than South Georgia, being farther south and more exposed to cold outbreaks from the Antarctic continent. They are also surrounded by sea ice from the middle of May to late November (even longer at their southern end). Recorded temperature extremes at South Thule Island have ranged from −29.8 to 17.7 °C (−21.6 to 63.9 °F).

Climate data for Bird Island, South Georgia, 1961–1990
Month	Jan	Feb	Mar	Apr	May	Jun	Jul	Aug	Sep	Oct	Nov	Dec	Year
Record high °C (°F)	11.2 (52.2)	10.7 (51.3)	10.5 (50.9)	10.2 (50.4)	6.9 (44.4)	6.0 (42.8)	5.9 (42.6)	4.8 (40.6)	7.5 (45.5)	10.4 (50.7)	9.1 (48.4)	9.4 (48.9)	11.2 (52.2)
Mean daily maximum °C (°F)	5.5 (41.9)	5.6 (42.1)	4.4 (39.9)	1.9 (35.4)	−0.5 (31.1)	−1.8 (28.8)	−2.4 (27.7)	−1.9 (28.6)	−0.2 (31.6)	1.6 (34.9)	3.4 (38.1)	4.5 (40.1)	1.7 (35.0)
Daily mean °C (°F)	3.1 (37.6)	3.5 (38.3)	2.5 (36.5)	0.4 (32.7)	−2.1 (28.2)	−3.2 (26.2)	−3.9 (25.0)	−3.3 (26.1)	−1.8 (28.8)	−0.2 (31.6)	1.0 (33.8)	2.0 (35.6)	−0.2 (31.7)
Mean daily minimum °C (°F)	0.7 (33.3)	1.4 (34.5)	0.6 (33.1)	−1 (30)	−3.8 (25.2)	−4.6 (23.7)	−5.4 (22.3)	−4.8 (23.4)	−3.4 (25.9)	−1.9 (28.6)	−1.5 (29.3)	−0.6 (30.9)	−2.0 (28.4)
Record low °C (°F)	−2 (28)	−1.7 (28.9)	−3.2 (26.2)	−4.6 (23.7)	−7.3 (18.9)	−8.5 (16.7)	−11.4 (11.5)	−10.6 (12.9)	−8.5 (16.7)	−6.6 (20.1)	−4.3 (24.3)	−2.8 (27.0)	−11.4 (11.5)
Average precipitation mm (inches)	84 (3.3)	80 (3.1)	95 (3.7)	123 (4.8)	108 (4.3)	108 (4.3)	120 (4.7)	114 (4.5)	107 (4.2)	98 (3.9)	88 (3.5)	77 (3.0)	1,204 (47.4)
Source 1: Climatic Research Unit, UEA
Source 2: Météo Climat

Climate data for Grytviken/King Edward Point, South Georgia, 1901–1950 (Sunshine 1931–1960)
Month	Jan	Feb	Mar	Apr	May	Jun	Jul	Aug	Sep	Oct	Nov	Dec	Year
Record high °C (°F)	24.5 (76.1)	26.5 (79.7)	28.8 (83.8)	19.1 (66.4)	17.5 (63.5)	14.0 (57.2)	13.6 (56.5)	13.2 (55.8)	17.0 (62.6)	20.0 (68.0)	22.5 (72.5)	21.5 (70.7)	28.8 (83.8)
Mean daily maximum °C (°F)	8.4 (47.1)	9.1 (48.4)	8.4 (47.1)	5.6 (42.1)	2.9 (37.2)	0.9 (33.6)	1.2 (34.2)	1.5 (34.7)	3.5 (38.3)	5.4 (41.7)	6.5 (43.7)	7.5 (45.5)	5.1 (41.2)
Daily mean °C (°F)	4.6 (40.3)	5.1 (41.2)	4.4 (39.9)	2.3 (36.1)	0.0 (32.0)	−1.6 (29.1)	−1.5 (29.3)	−1.8 (28.8)	−0.1 (31.8)	1.6 (34.9)	2.7 (36.9)	3.7 (38.7)	1.6 (34.9)
Mean daily minimum °C (°F)	1.4 (34.5)	1.7 (35.1)	1.0 (33.8)	−0.8 (30.6)	−3.1 (26.4)	−4.6 (23.7)	−4.7 (23.5)	−4.9 (23.2)	−3.3 (26.1)	−1.8 (28.8)	−0.5 (31.1)	0.4 (32.7)	−1.6 (29.1)
Record low °C (°F)	−4.1 (24.6)	−3.7 (25.3)	−6.3 (20.7)	−9.8 (14.4)	−11.4 (11.5)	−14.6 (5.7)	−15.2 (4.6)	−19.2 (−2.6)	−18.4 (−1.1)	−11 (12)	−6.4 (20.5)	−5.4 (22.3)	−19.2 (−2.6)
Average precipitation mm (inches)	92 (3.6)	114 (4.5)	136 (5.4)	139 (5.5)	137 (5.4)	135 (5.3)	149 (5.9)	149 (5.9)	92 (3.6)	80 (3.1)	93 (3.7)	88 (3.5)	1,394 (54.9)
Average precipitation days (≥ 0.1 mm)	12	13	14	14	12	15	15	14	11	12	11	11	154
Average relative humidity (%)	72	69	69	70	74	75	74	73	72	70	69	71	72
Mean monthly sunshine hours	152	160	127	66	34	12	22	74	123	171	174	167	1,282
Source 1: Globalbioclimatics/Salvador Rivas-Martínez
Source 2: DMI/Danish Meteorology Institute (sun, humidity, and precipitation days 1931–1960)

== Government ==
King Charles III is the head of state of South Georgia and the South Sandwich Islands.

Executive power is vested in the monarch of the United Kingdom and is exercised by the Commissioner, a post held by the Governor of the Falkland Islands. The current Commissioner is Colin Martin-Reynolds, who took the post on 29 July 2025.

The executive, based in Stanley, Falkland Islands, is made up of a Chief Executive, three Directors, two managers, and a Business Support Officer.

The Financial Secretary and Attorney General of the territory are appointed ex officio similar appointments in the Falkland Islands' government.

On the island itself, Government Officers manage vessel visits, fishing and tourism, and represent the government 'on the ground'. A summer Deputy Postmaster runs the Post Office at Grytviken during the tourism season.

As no permanent inhabitants live on the islands, no legislative council nor elections are needed. The UK Foreign, Commonwealth and Development Office (FCDO) manages the foreign relations of the territory. Since 1982, the territory celebrates Liberation Day on 25 April.

The constitution of the territory (adopted 3 October 1985), the manner in which its government is directed and the availability of judicial review were discussed in a series of litigations between 2001 and 2005 (see, in particular, Regina v. Secretary of State for Foreign and Commonwealth Affairs (Appellant) ex parte Quark Fishing Limited [2005] UKHL 57). Although its government is directed by the FCDO, it was held that, since it was acting as an agent of the Crown in right of South Georgia and the South Sandwich Islands rather than in right of the UK, its decisions under that direction could not be challenged as if they were in law decisions of a UK government department; thus the European Convention on Human Rights did not apply.

== Economy ==
Commercial sealing occurred on the islands between 1817 and 1909. During that period 20 visits are recorded by sealing vessels.

Economic activity in South Georgia and the South Sandwich Islands is limited. The territory has revenues of £6.3 million, 80% of which is derived from fishing licences (2020 figures). Other sources of revenue are the sale of postage stamps and coins, tourism, and customs and harbour dues.

=== Fishing ===
Fishing takes place around South Georgia and in adjacent waters in some months of the year, with fishing licences sold by the territory for Patagonian toothfish, cod icefish and krill. Fishing licences bring in millions of pounds a year, most of which is spent on fishery protection and research. All fisheries are regulated and managed in accordance with the Convention for the Conservation of Antarctic Marine Living Resources (CCAMLR) system.

In 2001 the South Georgia government was cited by the Marine Stewardship Council for its sustainable Patagonian toothfish fishery, certifying that South Georgia met the MSC's environmental standards. The certificate places limits on the timing and quantity of Patagonian toothfish that may be caught.

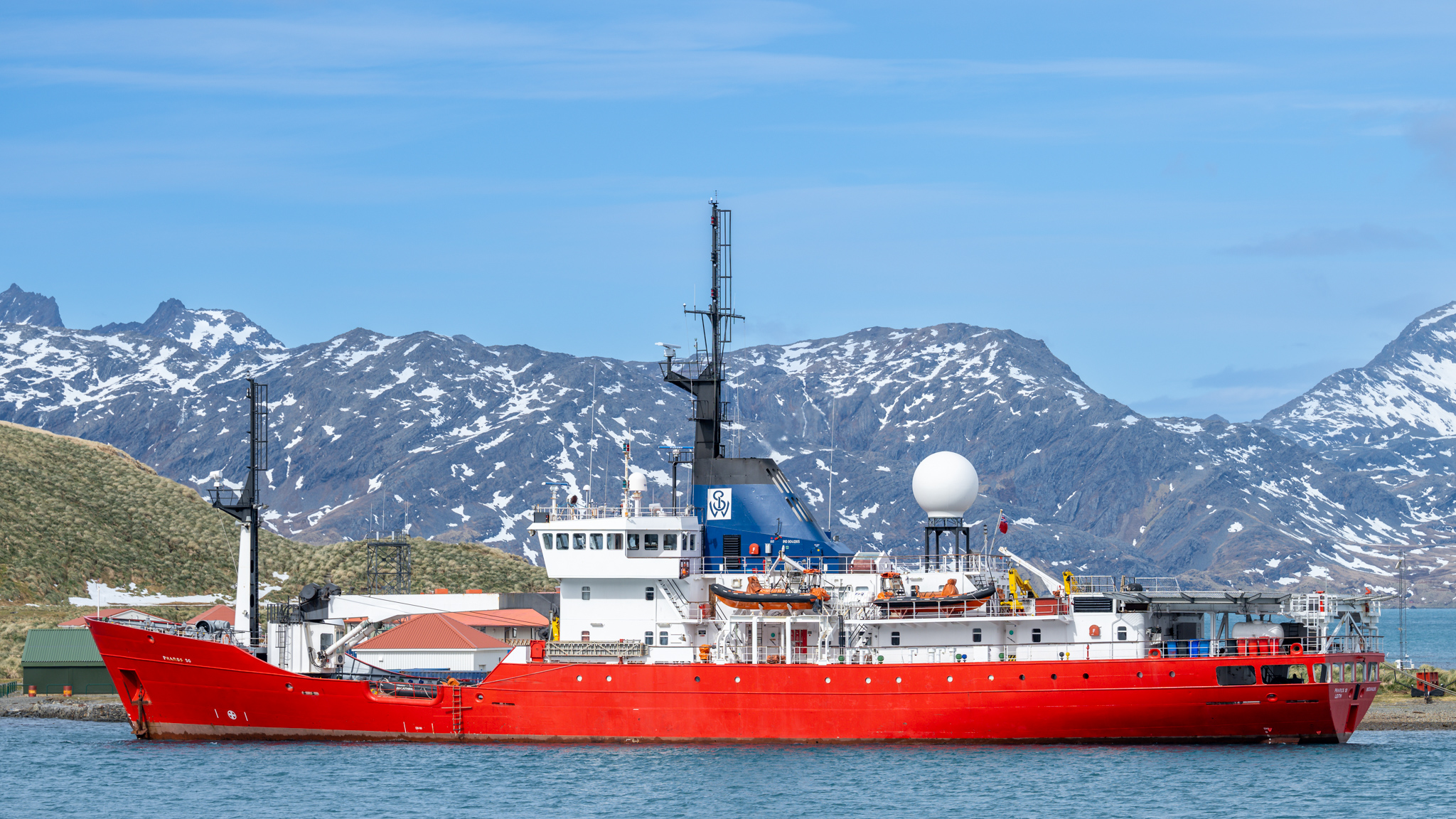
MV Pharos SG at Grytviken in 2024

Fisheries and environmental protection is the responsibility of the Government of South Georgia and the South Sandwich Islands (GSGSSI) which contracts with Workboat Services Limited (WBS), a Falkland Islands company, to operate the vessel MV Pharos SG in the South Georgia & South Sandwich Islands Maritime Zone. The current contract for that service runs until 2028.

Toothfish are vital to the islands' economy; as a result, Toothfish Day is celebrated on 4 September as a bank holiday in the territory.

=== Tourism ===
Tourism has become a larger source of income in recent years, with many cruise ships and sailing yachts visiting the area (the only way to visit South Georgia is by sea; there are no airstrips on the Islands). The territory gains income from landing charges and the sale of souvenirs. Cruise ships often combine a Grytviken visit with a trip to the Antarctic Peninsula.

Charter yacht visits usually begin in the Falkland Islands, last between four and six weeks, and enable guests to visit remote harbours of South Georgia and the South Sandwich Islands. Sailing vessels are now required to anchor out and can no longer tie up to the old whaling piers on shore. One exception to this is the recently upgraded/repaired yacht berth at Grytviken. All other jetties at former whaling stations lie inside a 200 m (656 ft) exclusion zone; berthing, or putting ropes ashore, at these is forbidden. Yachts visiting South Georgia are normally expected to report to the government officers at King Edward Point before moving round the island.

=== Postage stamps ===
A large source of income from abroad also comes from the issue of South Georgia and the South Sandwich Islands postage stamps which are produced in the UK. A reasonable issue policy (few sets of stamps are issued each year) along with attractive subject matter (especially whales) makes them popular with topical stamp collectors.

There are only four genuine first day cover sets from 16 March 1982 in existence. They were stamped at the South Georgia Post Office; all those in circulation were stamped elsewhere and sent out, but the only genuine ones were kept at the Post Office on South Georgia. These four sets were removed during the Falklands War by a member of staff of the British Antarctic Survey in the few moments the Argentinians allowed them to gather their belongings. Everything else was burnt, but these four sets were saved and brought to the UK by Robert Headland, BAS.

=== Currency ===
The pound sterling is the official currency of the islands, and the same notes and coins are used as in the United Kingdom.

=== Internet domain registration ===
The Internet country code top-level domain (ccTLD) for South Georgia and the South Sandwich Islands is .gs.

=== Time ===
Time in South Georgia and the South Sandwich Islands
- Time zone

UTC offset
- GST: UTC−02:00

Current time
- :: UTC−02:00 [refresh]

Observance of DST
- DST is not observed in this time zone.

South Georgia and the South Sandwich Islands uses South Georgia Time (GST, UTC−02:00).

The British Overseas Territory shifted from local mean time to a standard time zone in 1890.

== Ecology ==
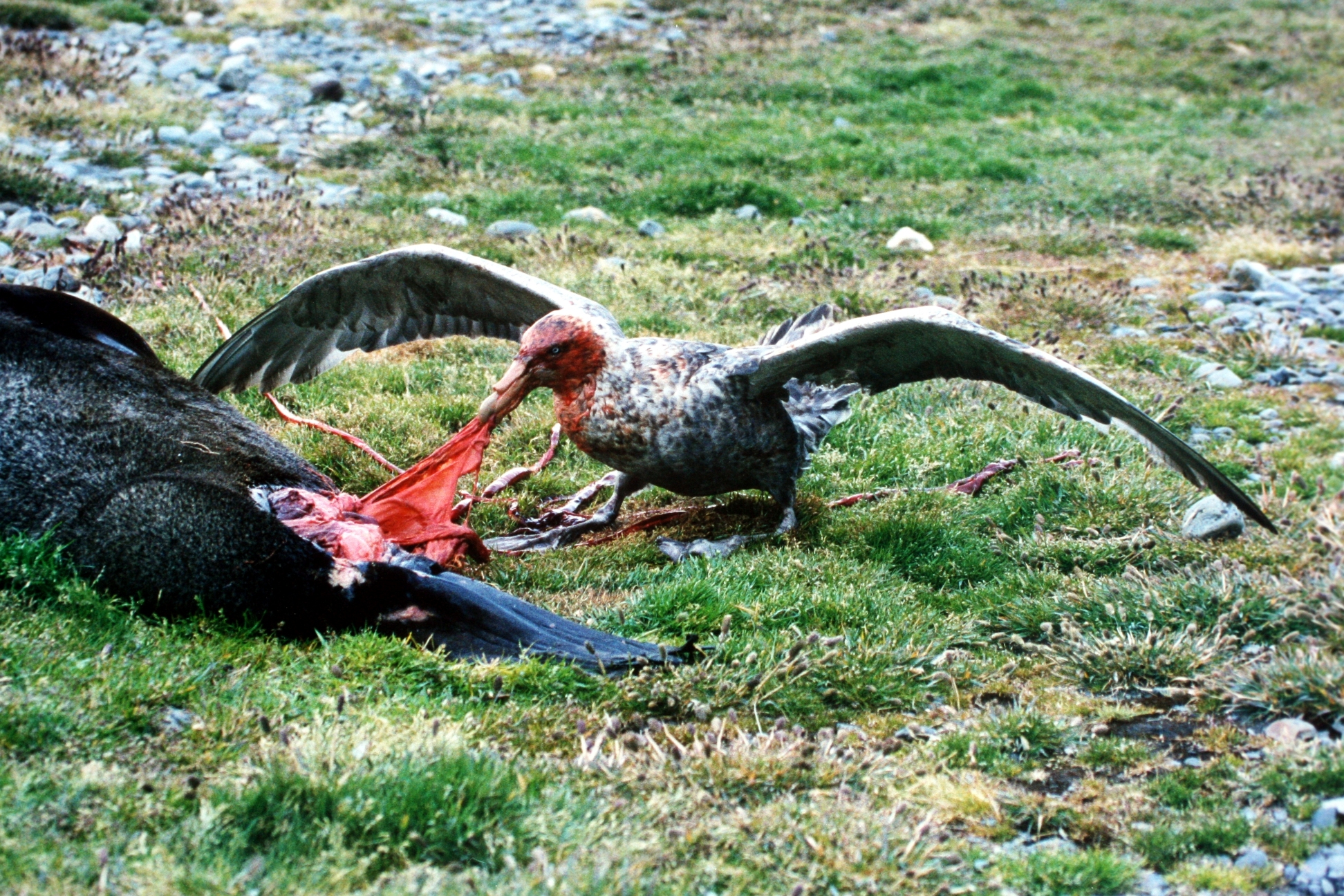
Southern giant petrel on South Georgia Island

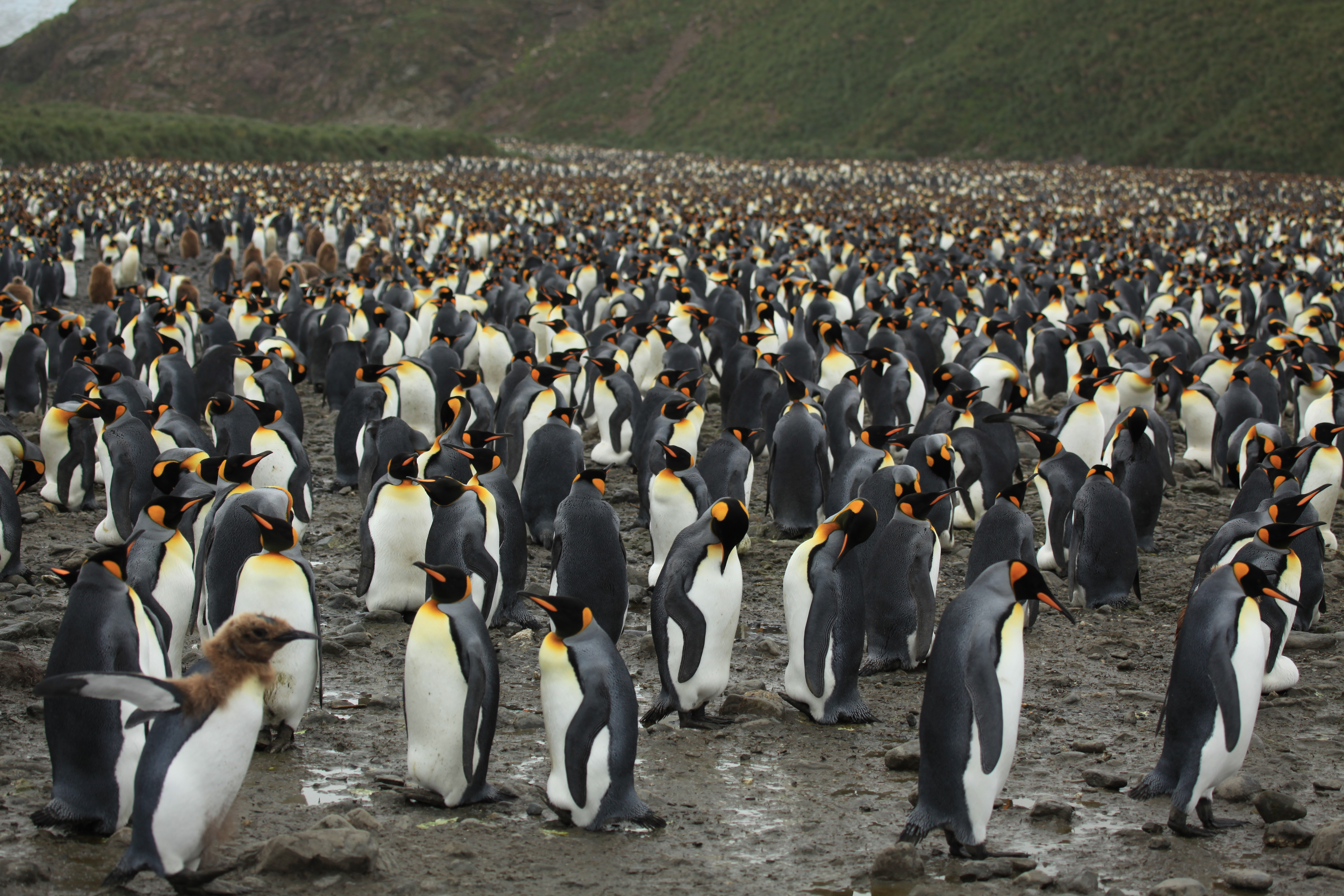
A colony of up to 60,000 king penguins (Aptenodytes patagonicus) on Salisbury Plain

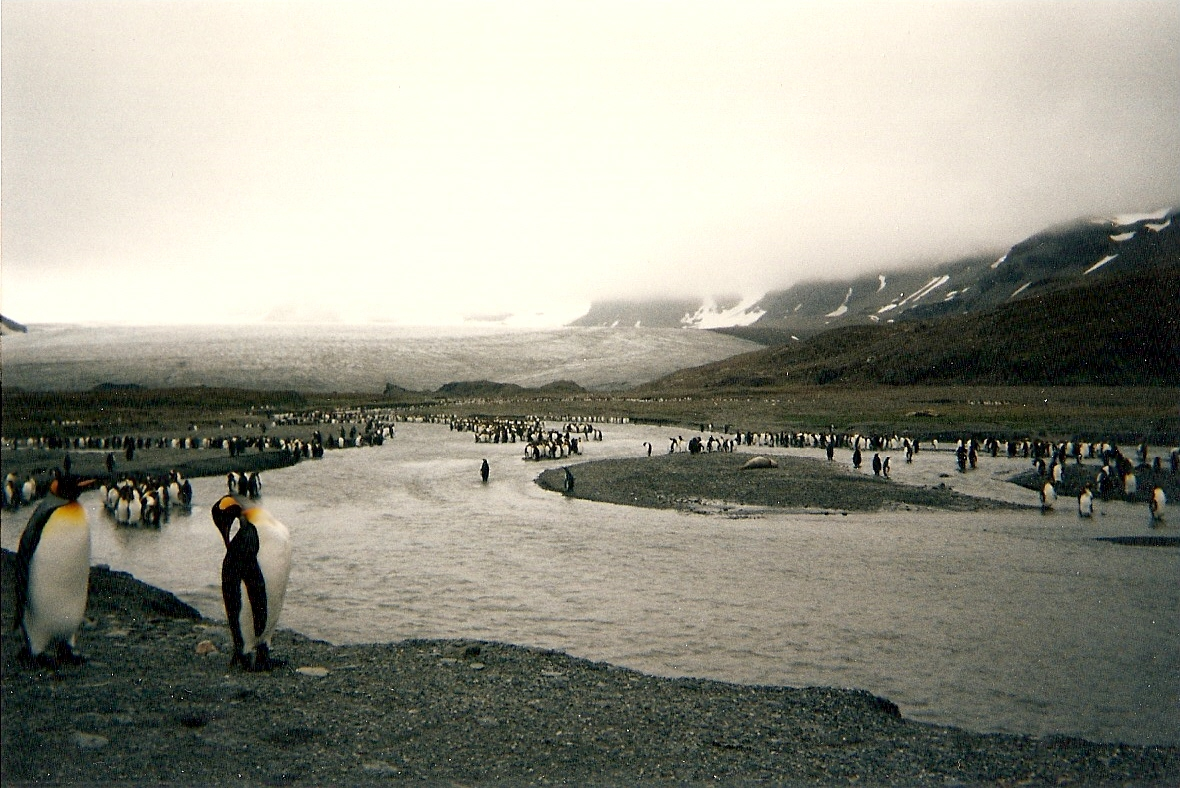
King penguins at St Andrews Bay, South Georgia Island, 1996

=== Plants ===
==== Native plants ====
The parts of the islands that are not permanently covered in snow or ice are part of the Scotia Sea Islands tundra ecoregion. In total there are 26 known species of vascular plant native to South Georgia; six species of grass, four rushes, a single sedge, six ferns, one clubmoss and nine small forbs. There are also about 125 species of moss, 85 of liverworts and 150 lichens, as well as about 50 species of macrofungi. There are no trees or shrubs on the islands.

The largest plant is the tussock grass Poa flabellata. This grows mostly on raised beaches and steep slopes near the shore and may reach 2 m (7 ft). Other grasses include the tufted fescue (Festuca contracta), the Alpine cat's-tail (Phleum alpinum) and Antarctic hair-grass (Deschampsia antarctica), and one of the most common flowering plants is the greater burnet (Acaena magellanica).

==== Introduced plants ====
A number of introduced species have become naturalised; many of these were introduced by whalers in cattle fodder, and some are considered invasive.

There have been 76 introduced plant species recorded in South Georgia. 35 of these are considered eradicated, with 41 still considered present on the island. 33 of these species are planned for eradication by 2020. It is considered important to control the spread of these exotic species as they readily enter this vulnerable, pristine ecosystem and outcompete populations of native flora for resources (e.g. light, nutrients) and negatively affect small, fragile habitats for the South Georgia fauna.

Current pest plant management efforts began in the early 2000s and are primarily targeted toward the species with easier expectations of eradication in the near-term (such as bittercress and procumbent pearlwort), with remaining species to be targeted in future seasons. These programmes involved the collaboration of the South Georgia and South Sandwich Islands Government, Royal Botanical Gardens Kew, UK Darwin Initiative and private contractors.

The introduced plant species of South Georgia arrived primarily alongside human economic activities in the island and were mostly accidental, (before visitors had an understanding of their consequences). Annual meadow grass (Poa annua) is believed to have arrived approximately 1800 with the first sealers, and is now widespread across the island, particularly old sealing and whaling sites. Dandelions are believed to have been introduced alongside whaling operations, via the practice of including a handful of soil from the deceased whaler's home country. Bittercress was first spotted in 2002 and is thought to have arrived alongside building supplies at King Edward Cove. Introductions have since slowed in recent decades with the introduction of thorough biosecurity protocols. Non-native species management will require several years of regular, dedicated follow-up treatments to ensure that all germinating seed currently in the soil is controlled prior to maturity before success will be achieved.

=== Birds ===
South Georgia supports many sea birds, including albatross, a large colony of king penguins, Macaroni penguins and penguins of various other species, along with petrels, prions, shags, skuas, gulls and terns. Birds unique to the archipelago are the South Georgia shag, South Georgia pipit, and the South Georgia pintail. Both South Georgia and the South Sandwich Islands have been identified as Important Bird Areas (IBA) by BirdLife International.

=== Mammals ===
Seals frequent the islands, and whales may be seen in the surrounding waters. There are no native land mammals, though reindeer, brown rats and mice were introduced to South Georgia through human activities.

Rats, brought to the island as stowaways on sealing and whaling ships in the late 18th century, have caused much damage to native wildlife, destroying tens of millions of ground-nesting birds' eggs and chicks. While previously the island's glaciers formed a natural barrier to the spread of rats, these glaciers are now slowly melting as the climate warms. In 2011, scientists instituted a four-year programme to entirely eradicate the rats and mice, in what would be by far the largest rodent eradication attempt in the world to date. The project was led by zoologist Anthony Martin of The University of Dundee who stated, "This is a man-induced problem and it's about time that man put right earlier errors." In July 2013, the success of the main phase of the extermination of the rats, which took place in May that year, was announced. 180 tonnes of rat poison, brodifacoum, were dropped over 70% of the island, in what was the world's largest ever operation of this kind. Another 95 tonnes of rat poison was planned to be dropped by three helicopters in January 2015.

In June 2015 the eradication programme concluded, apparently successfully, with the island believed "very likely" to be rat free. In 2017–18, an intensive six-month search by the South Georgia Heritage Trust, using sniffer dogs and baited traps, found no evidence of rodent presence. Monitoring will continue for a further two or three years. In 2018, the number of South Georgia pipits had clearly increased. As of 2024, the island remained rat-free, with a permanent team to check incoming vessels.

Reindeer were introduced to South Georgia in 1911 by Norwegian whalers for meat and for sport hunting. In February 2011, the authorities announced that due to the reindeer's detrimental effect on native species and the threat of their spreading to presently pristine areas, a complete cull would take place, leading to the eradication of reindeer from the island. The eradication began in 2013 with 3,500 reindeer killed. Nearly all the rest were killed in early 2014, with the last (about 50) cleared in the 2014–15 southern summer.

=== Marine ecosystem ===
The seas around South Georgia have a high level of biodiversity. In a recent study (2009–2011), South Georgia has been discovered to contain one of the highest levels of biodiversity among all the ecosystems on Earth. In respect to species, marine inhabitants endemic to this ecosystem outnumber and (in respect to biodiversity) surpass well-known regions such as the Galápagos or Ecuador. The marine ecosystem is thought to be vulnerable because its low temperatures mean that it can repair itself only very slowly. On 23 February 2012, to protect marine biodiversity, the territory's government created the South Georgia and the South Sandwich Islands Marine Protected Area – comprising 1.07 million km^{2} (410,000 mi^{2}).

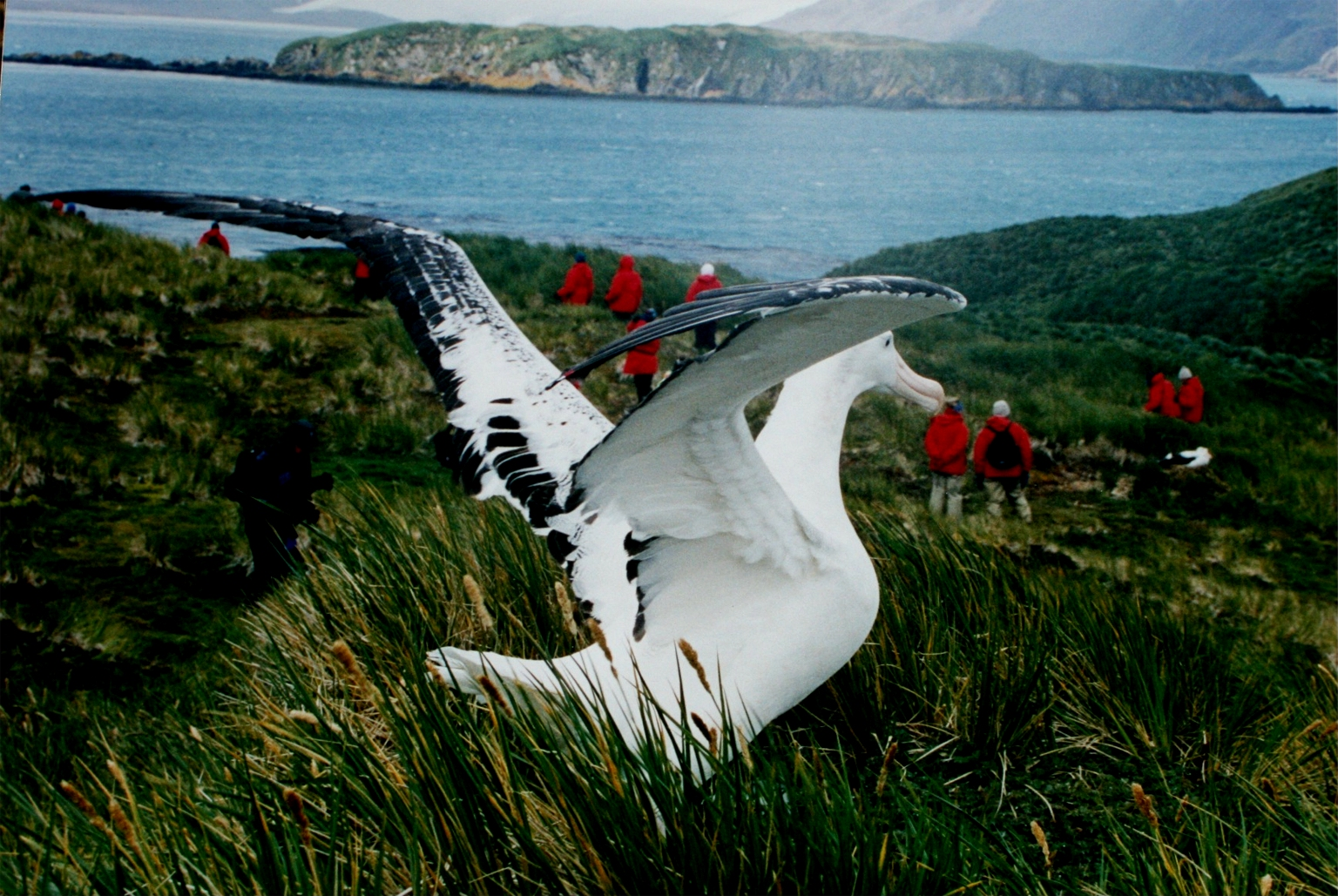
Wandering albatross at South Georgia Island

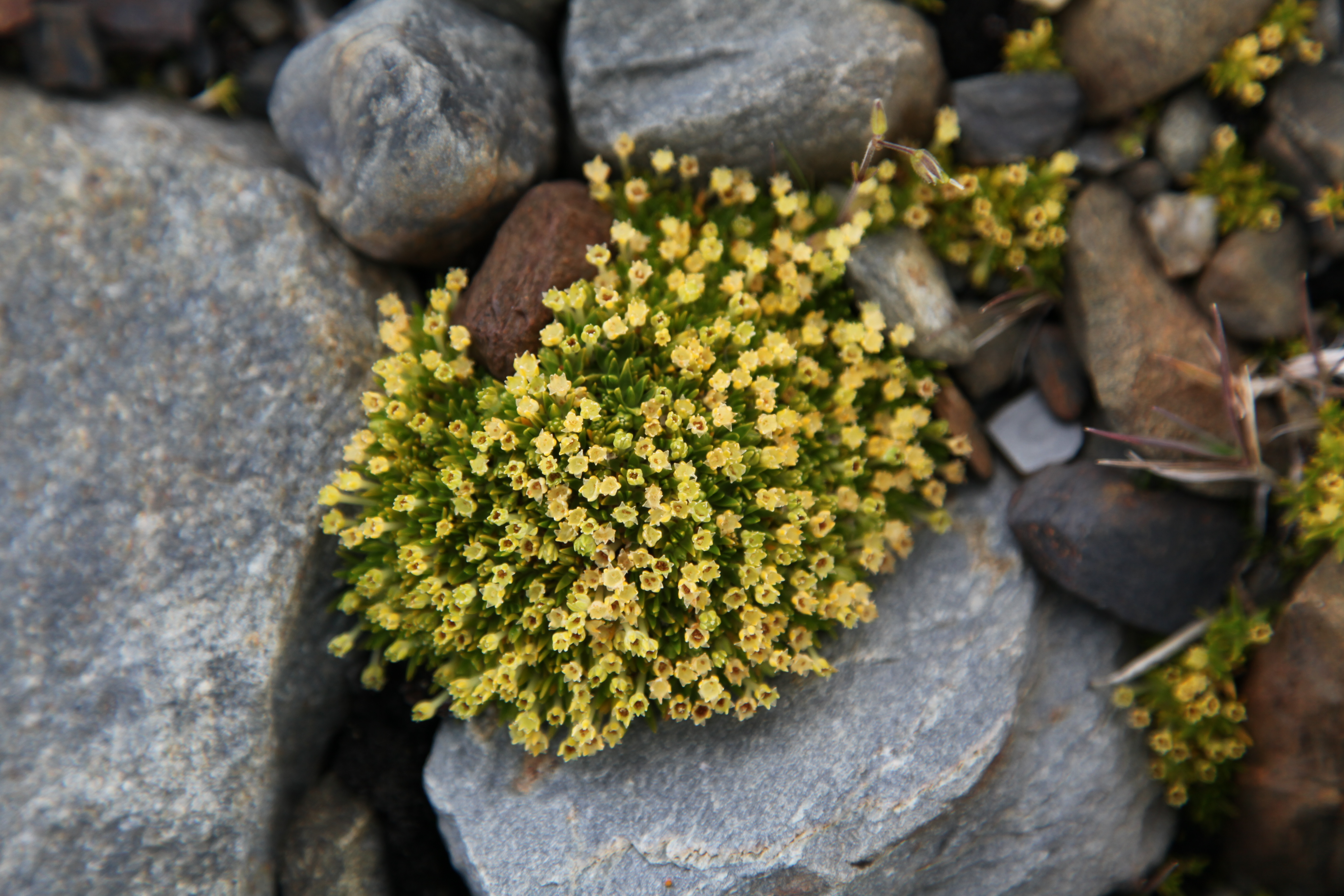
Antarctic Pearlwort at St. Andrews Bay, South Georgia

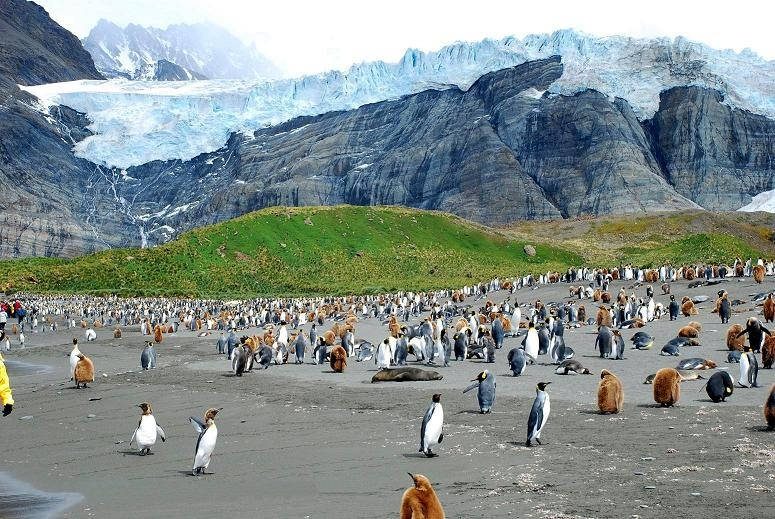
South Georgia glacier and penguin colony

== Military ==
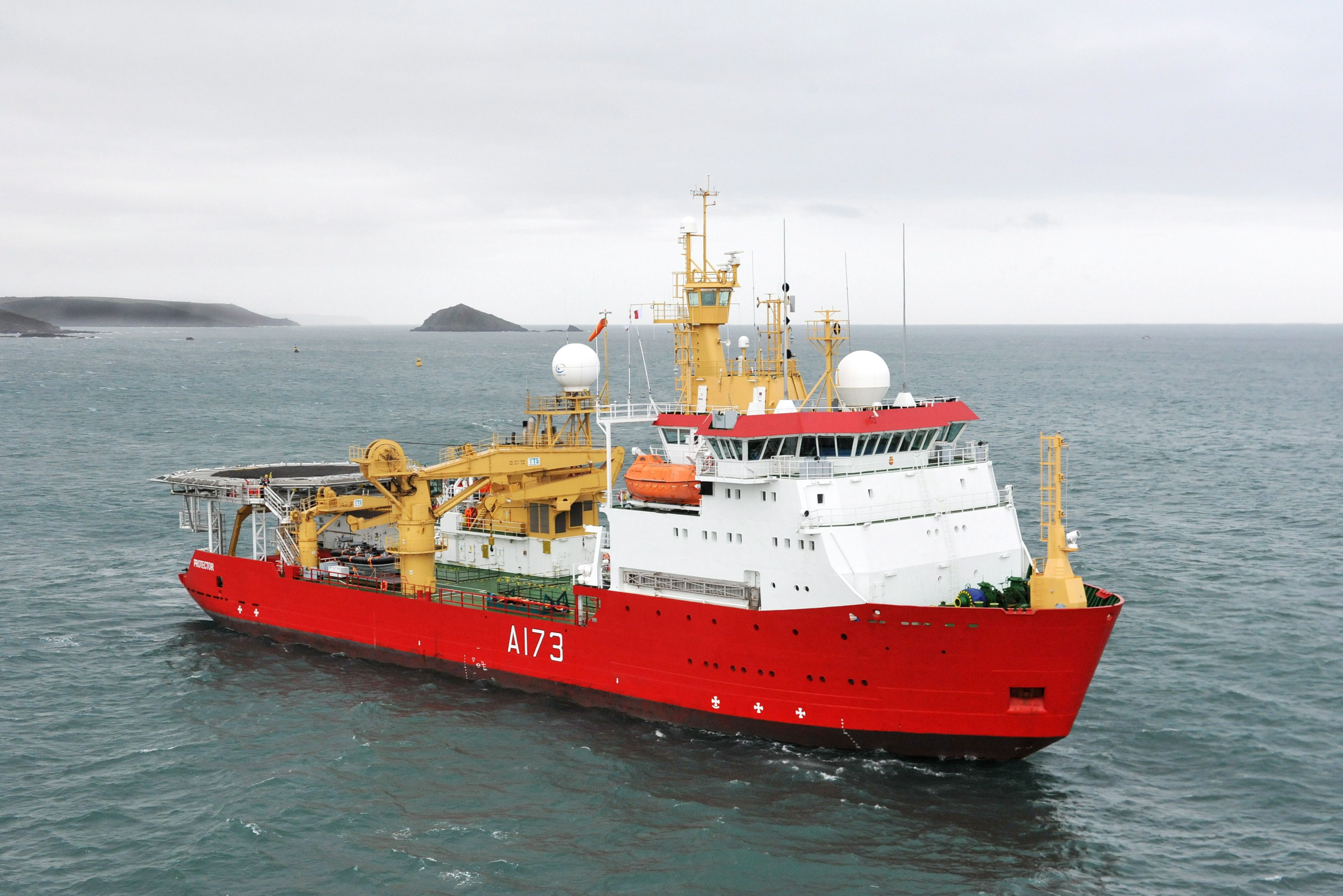
HMS Protector

After the Falklands War in 1982, a full-time British military presence was maintained at King Edward Point on South Georgia. This was scaled down during the 1990s until the last detachment left South Georgia in March 2001, after a new station had been built and occupied by the British Antarctic Survey.

The main British military facility in the region is at RAF Mount Pleasant and the adjacent Mare Harbour naval base on East Falkland, and three Remote Radar Heads on the Falklands: RRH Mount Kent, RRH Byron Heights and RRH Mount Alice. A handful of British naval vessels patrol the region, visiting South Georgia a few times each year and sometimes deploying small infantry patrols. Flights by RAF Airbus A400M and Airbus A330 MRTT (named Atlas and Voyager by the RAF respectively) aircraft also occasionally patrol the territory.

A Royal Navy warship carries out the Atlantic Patrol Tasking South mission in the surrounding area.

HMS Endurance, the Royal Navy ice-patrol ship, operated in the South Georgia area during part of most southern summer seasons until her near loss due to flooding in 2008. She carried out hydrological and mapping work as well as assisting with scientific fieldwork for the British Antarctic Survey, film and photographic units, and youth expedition group BSES Expeditions. While the final decision on the fate of Endurance was pending, the Royal Navy chartered a Norwegian icebreaker, renamed HMS Protector, to act as replacement for three years. In September 2013 the British Ministry of Defence purchased the ship outright. It was announced on 7 October 2013 that Endurance would be sold for scrap.

== See also ==
- Bibliography of South Georgia and the South Sandwich Islands
- Cape Flannery
- Hardy Point
- Herd Point
- Horsburgh Point
- Hueca Point
- Index of South Georgia and the South Sandwich Islands-related articles
- List of Antarctic and subantarctic islands
- Lists of islands
- Rail transport in South Georgia and the South Sandwich Islands
