= Douglas Strait =

Coordinates: 59°27′S 27°14′W

Douglas Strait is a strait 2 nautical miles (4 km) wide between Thule Island and Cook Island, in the South Sandwich Islands. The existence of this strait was first noted by a Russian expedition under Fabian Gottlieb von Bellingshausen in 1820. It was charted in 1930 by Discovery Investigations personnel on the Discovery II and named for Vice-Admiral Sir Percy Douglas, a member of the Discovery Committee.

The north entry is between Beach Point, the northeast extremity of Morrell Island (Thule Island), and Tilbrook Point, the northwest extremity of Cook Island. The distance between these points is 5400 meters. The south entry is narrower, and between Hewison Point and Reef Point, which are 3000 meters apart, with navigation east of Twitcher Rock.
