= List of settlements in South Georgia and the South Sandwich Islands =

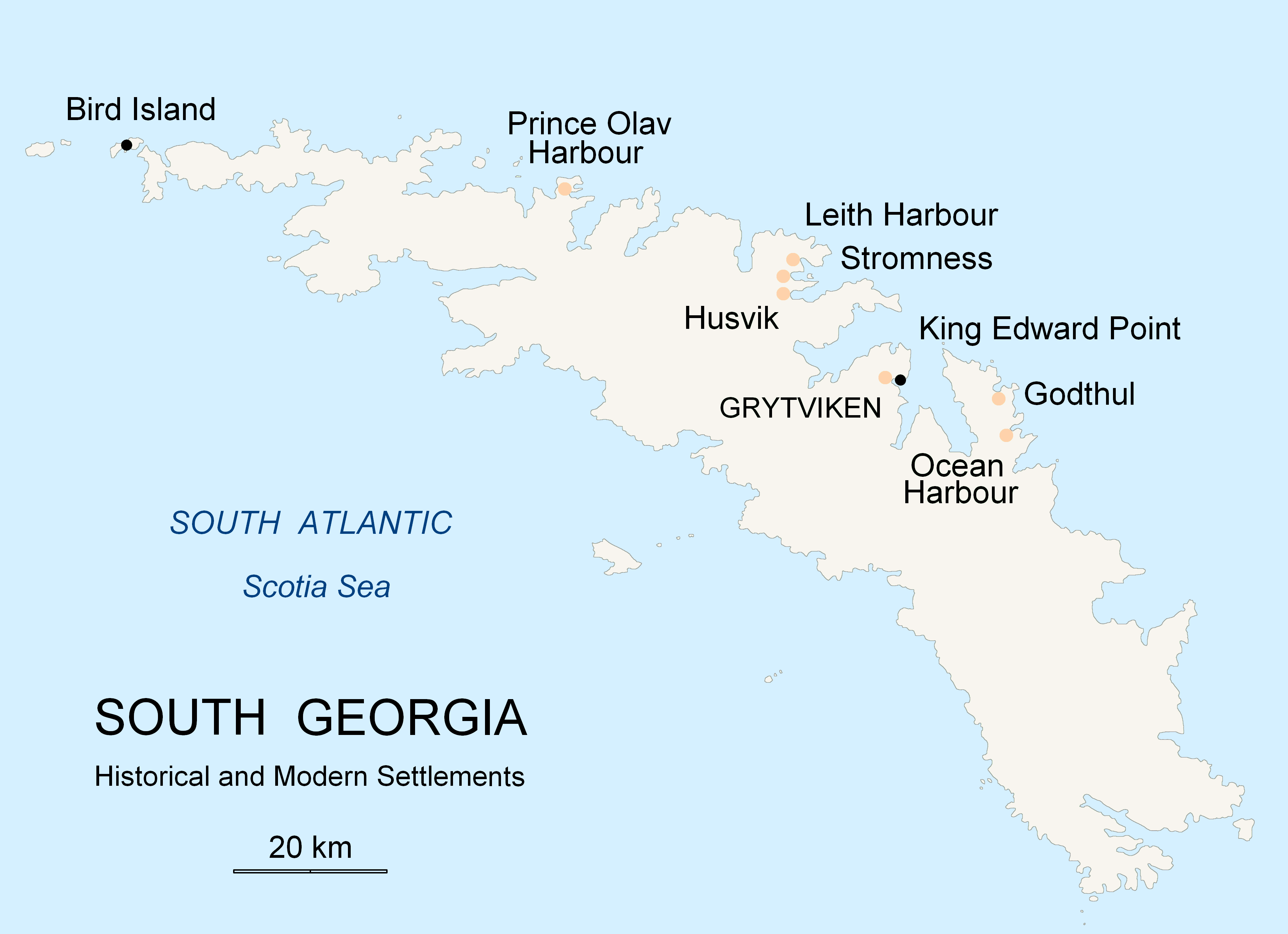
Settlements of South Georgia Island (orange dots); the South Sandwich Islands are not shown.

The following is a list of semi-permanent and permanent settlements on the British Overseas Territory of South Georgia and the South Sandwich Islands.

== Settlements ==
Settlements in South Georgia and the South Sandwich Islands
Name	Location (island)	Type	Founded	Status
Corbeta Uruguay base	Thule Island	Permanent	1976	Abandoned (1982)
Godthul	South Georgia	Semi-permanent	1908	Abandoned (1929)
Grytviken	South Georgia	Semi-permanent	1904	Operating
Husvik	South Georgia	Semi-permanent	1907	Abandoned (1960)
King Edward Point	South Georgia	Permanent	1950	Operating
Leith Harbour	South Georgia	Semi-permanent	1909	Abandoned (1965)
Ocean Harbour	South Georgia	Semi-permanent	1909	Abandoned (1920)
Prince Olav Harbour	South Georgia	Semi-permanent	1911	Abandoned (1931)
Stromness	South Georgia	Semi-permanent	1907	Abandoned (1961)

== See also ==
- List of settlements in the Falkland Islands
