= Sinbad Rock =

Antarctic rock

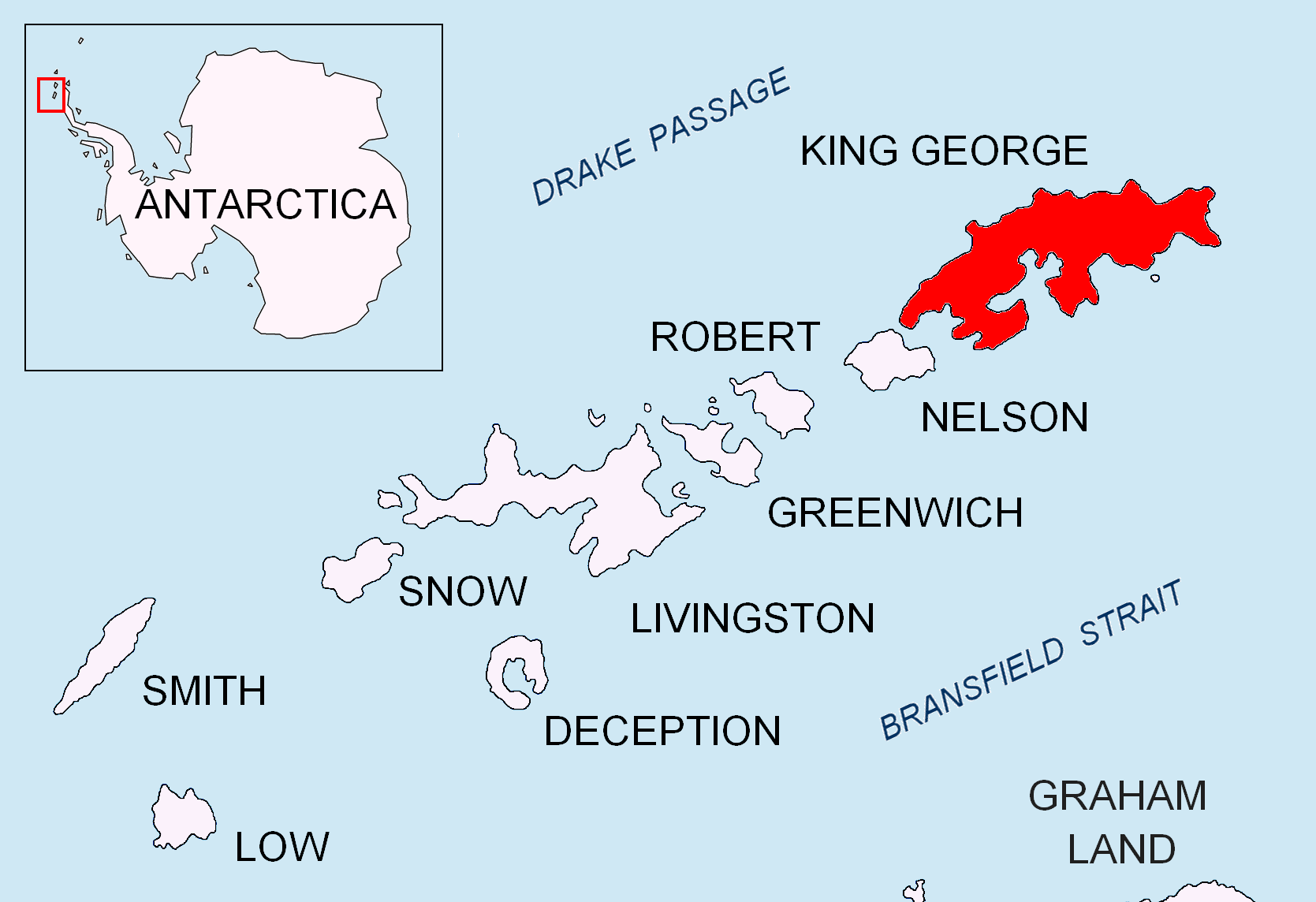
Location of King George Island in the South Shetland Islands.

Sinbad Rock (62°09′11″S 59°02′21″W) is a low rock (approximately 10 feet high) lying 1.25 nautical miles (2.3 km) west-northwest of Square End Island, off the west end of King George Island, in the South Shetland Islands. The rock was charted in 1935 by DI personnel on the Discovery II but the name appears to be first used on a 1948 Admiralty chart based upon this survey.

== Sources ==
- John Stewart (1990). "Sinbad Rock". Antarctica: An Encyclopedia. McFarland & Company. p. 913.
