= Cape Flannery =

Headland on Thule Island, South Snadwich Islands

Cape Flannery (59°27′S 27°21′W) is a cape which forms the west end of Thule Island in the South Sandwich Islands. It was charted in 1930 by Discovery Investigations personnel on the RSS Discovery II, who named it for Sir Fortescue Flannery, a member of the Discovery Committee.
