= Hewison Point =

Easternmost point of land on Thule Island

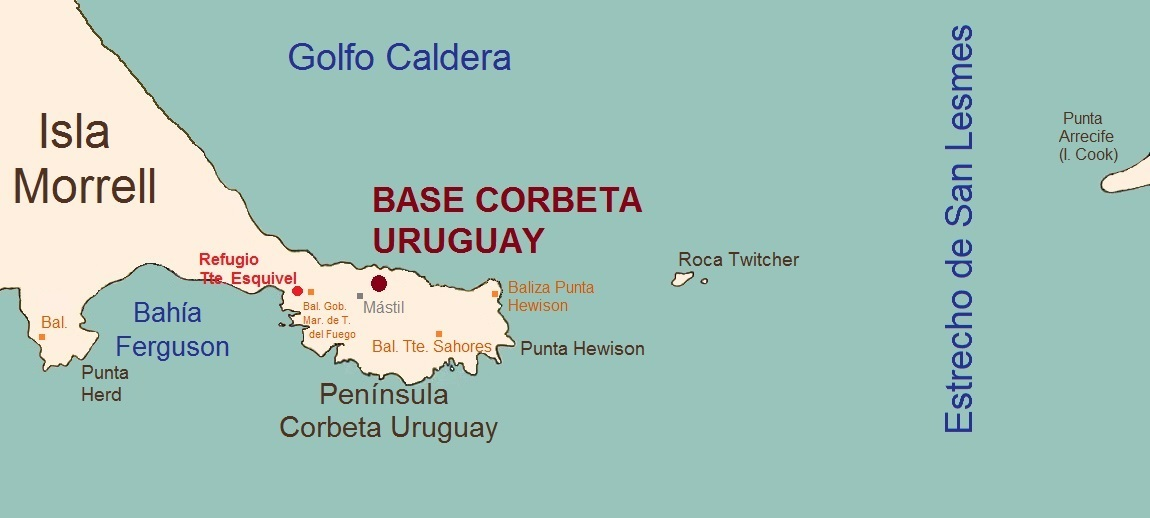
Punta Hewison on the map

Hewison Point (59°27′32.5″S 27°17′54.6″W) is a point which forms the east side of Ferguson Bay and the southeast end of Thule Island, in the South Sandwich Islands. It was first charted by a Russian expedition under Fabian Gottlieb von Bellingshausen in 1819–20. It was recharted in 1930 by Discovery Investigations personnel on the Discovery II who named it for Lieutenant Colonel Hewison of Ferguson Brothers, Port Glasgow, Scotland, builders of the Discovery II.
