= Hardy Point =

Hardy Point (59°25′S 27°4′W) is the western point of Bellingshausen Island in the South Sandwich Islands. It was charted in 1930 by Discovery Investigations personnel on the Discovery II, who named it for Alister C. Hardy, a member of the zoological staff of the Discovery Committee, 1924–28, and professor of zoology at University College Hull.
