= Operation Keyhole =

1982 British military operation during the Falklands War

Coordinates: 59°27′S 27°18′W

- Part of Falklands War
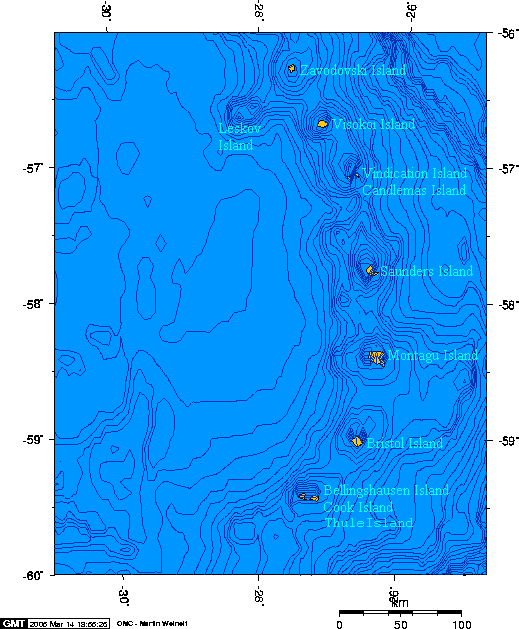
- South Sandwich Islands
- Type: Special operation
- Location: Thule Island, South Sandwich Islands
- Objective: Recapture Thule Island
- Date: 19–20 June 1982
- Executed by: 1 frigate 1 icebreaker 1 fleet tanker 6 helicopters 2 rifle troop units (from 42 Commando)
- Outcome: Operational success
- Casualties: 1 civilian and 9 Argentine military personnel captured

Operation Keyhole was a British special operation to recapture Thule Island in the South Sandwich Islands during the Falklands War. The operation took place from 19 to 20 June 1982.

== Background ==
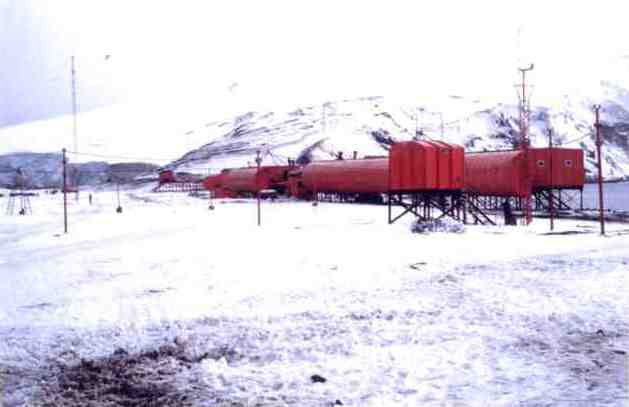
The Corbeta Uruguay station on Southern Thule, 1981

A base, called Corbeta Uruguay, had been built by Argentina in part to reinforce its territorial claims on British-held territory in the South Atlantic. Ostensibly a meteorological research station, it was also used by Argentine military personnel. The British government became aware of the base in December 1976. Between then and the outbreak of the 1982 war, a diplomatic solution to the problem had not been reached.

== Operation ==
After the Argentine surrender on the Falkland Islands on 14 June 1982, a task force composed of frigate HMS Yarmouth, patrol ship HMS Endurance, tanker RFA Olmeda and tug Salvageman sailed to the South Sandwich Islands with instructions to end the Argentine presence there.

Reconnaissance parties from Endurance and 42 Commando Royal Marines were landed on Thule Island covertly to observe Argentine activities. They encountered harsh conditions on the island with an air temperature of minus 20 degrees Celsius and a gale gusting to 60 mph (97 km/h), the chill factor caused an effective drop to minus 52 degrees. Yarmouth demonstrated her intention by firing her gun and several helicopters flew around the base. Under the threat of the Royal Marines party and the ships cruising in front of the base, the Argentinians raised a white flag. Royal Marines who were forced to lower the Union Flag on South Georgia on 3 April, now hoisted the Union Flag on Thule Island. The final surrender of the war was signed in the wardroom of Endurance with all commanders present.

Ten prisoners (one civilian and nine military personnel) were evacuated to the tanker Olmeda, accompanied by Yarmouth and they departed for South Georgia. The Argentine base "Corbeta Uruguay" was closed and the buildings sealed to make them weatherproof. The other ships Endurance and MS Salvageman followed and were back at Cumberland East Bay, South Georgia, by 24 June 1982. No deaths or injuries were suffered on either side.

== Aftermath ==
In March 1983, a UK spokesman said that on 19 December 1982, the research vessel, HMS Hecate, had discovered someone had been back to the base, had lowered the British flag, and raised the Argentinian flag in its place. The spokesman said: "We haven't a clue what went on and God only knows who it was—scrap metal merchants, someone in their cups (drunk) or the Argentine military". To prevent any attempt by Argentina to return to Thule Island, the base was later demolished, in February 1983, by crew from HMS Ariadne and the supply ship RFA Tidespring. The flagpole, two weather beacons, and a fully provisioned hut were left intact.

== See also ==
- Hope Bay incident
