= Percy Douglas =

Royal Navy admiral

Vice-Admiral Sir Percy Douglas KCB CMG FRGS FRAS
- Born: Henry Percy Douglas; 1 November 1876; Higher Bebington, Cheshire, England
- Died: 4 November 1939 (aged 63); Dover, Kent, England
- Military career
- Allegiance: United Kingdom
- Branch: Royal Navy
- Service years: 1890–1932; 1939
- Rank: Vice-Admiral
- Commands: HMS Waterwitch; HMS Mutine; HMS Ormonde; Hydrographer of the Navy (1924–1932)
- Conflicts: World War I; World War II
- Awards: Knight Commander of the Order of the Bath; Companion of the Order of St Michael and St George; Order of Leopold (Belgium); Medal of Military Valor (Italy)

Vice-Admiral Sir Henry Percy Douglas KCB CMG FRGS FRAS (1 November 1876 – 4 November 1939) was a British naval officer who specialised in surveying and was Hydrographer of the Navy.

He competed in the rifle shooting event at the Summer Olympic Games.

== Career ==
Henry Percy Douglas was educated at Eastman's Royal Naval Academy, Southsea before entering the Royal Navy training ship HMS Britannia as a cadet in 1890. In 1892 he was appointed to HMS Cleopatra as a midshipman. In 1894 he was part of a landing party at Bluefields during the Nicaraguan campaign to annex the Mosquito Coast. In 1895 he was transferred to the newly launched Majestic as acting sub-lieutenant; his promotion was confirmed in March 1896 and he was appointed to HMS Stork, the first of the many surveying ships in which he served at various times all over the world. In 1898 he was promoted to lieutenant.

In 1908, still with the rank of lieutenant, he was given his first command, the surveying ship Waterwitch. From 1910 to 1914 he was Superintendent of Charts in the Hydrographic Department of the British Admiralty. He was promoted to Commander on 31 December 1910.

In February 1915, at the beginning of the Dardanelles Campaign, Admiral John de Robeck asked the Admiralty for a good surveying officer and Douglas was sent out to join the flagship Inflexible. Later he transferred to Queen Elizabeth and Lord Nelson. De Robeck's dispatches contain several mentions of Douglas' "work of inestimable value to the fleet". His expertise was in fact indispensable for successful landing operations. His zeal and ability were recognized by promotion to acting captain in October 1915, confirmed at the end of the year. After the evacuation of the Gallipoli peninsula in January 1916 Douglas returned to the Admiralty and served as Director of the Naval Meteorological Service. Then in 1918 Admiral Roger Keyes, commanding the Dover Patrol, who had been with de Robeck in the Dardanelles campaign, asked for Douglas to join his staff at Dover to prepare for the Zeebrugge Raid and the First Ostend Raid in April 1918. After the raids Douglas was appointed CMG "in recognition of distinguished services during the operations against Zeebrugge and Ostend on the night of the 22nd–23rd April, 1918." He was also awarded the Belgian Order of Leopold and the Italian Medal of Military Valor.

After the war Douglas served as Assistant Hydrographer of the Navy 1919–21, then commanded HMS Mutine 1921–23 and, briefly, HMS Ormonde in 1924 for surveys in British Guiana and the West Indies. He was appointed Hydrographer of the Navy in October 1924. About this time he devised the Douglas Sea Scale. As Hydrographer, he was an advocate of echo sounding as a replacement for lead and line in depth measurement. The method increased productivity, and provided a continuous record of depth over a sounding line, reducing the chance of missing hazardous obstructions. He was promoted to Rear-Admiral in 1927. In 1929, after the normal five years as Hydrographer, he was offered an extension of three years and accepted it on condition of being placed on the Retired List. He was promoted to vice-admiral in 1931. From 1928 to 1932 he was the Navy's representative on the Discovery Committee for exploration in Antarctica.

After finally retiring in 1932, Douglas was Acting Conservator of the River Mersey and Nautical Assessor to the House of Lords. From 1934 until 1939 he was chairman of the Dover Harbour Board. He was chairman of the British Graham Land Expedition Advisory Committee. On the outbreak of World War II in September 1939 he returned to the Navy and was appointed commodore superintendent of Dover, but he died there on 4 November of the same year.

== Honours ==
Percy Douglas was appointed CMG in 1918, as mentioned above, and CB in 1929. He was a Naval Aide-de-Camp to the King for six months 1926–27 He was knighted KCB in the New Year Honours of 1933. He was a Younger Brother of Trinity House.

Some geographical features in Antarctica are named after him: the Douglas Range, Douglas Islands and Douglas Strait.

== Family ==
Henry Percy Douglas was born at Dacre Hill, Higher Bebington, Cheshire, on 1 November 1876, the second son of Admiral Sholto Douglas (1833–1913) and his first wife, Maria Louisa, the only daughter of William Bickford, of Stonehouse, Devon.

On 28 December 1899, he married Katherine Chute Mackenzie, daughter of John Mackenzie, of Belmont, near Kirkcudbright. They had one daughter.
