= Mount Larsen (South Sandwich Islands) =

Mountain in the South Sandwich Islands

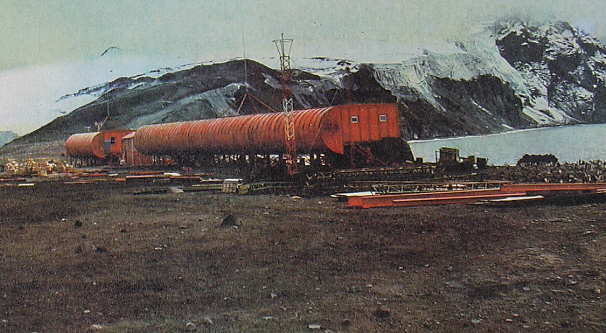
View of Corbeta Uruguay base with Mount Larsen in the background

Mount Larsen (59°27′S 27°18′W) is a mountain, 710 metres (2,330 ft) high, situated in the east-central portion of Thule Island in the South Sandwich Islands. It was charted in 1930 by Discovery Investigations personnel on the Discovery II who named it for Captain C.A. Larsen.
