= Mount Larsen =

Mount Larsen is the name of two mountains in Antarctica:

- Mount Larsen (South Sandwich Islands)
- Mount Larsen (Victoria Land)
