= Rail transport in South Georgia and the South Sandwich Islands =

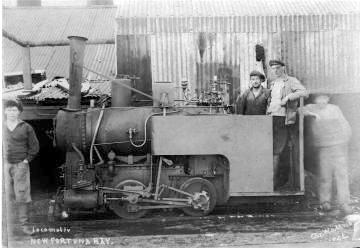
Locomotive used on the railway in South Georgia, Ocean Harbour, c. 1910

There are currently no operational railways in South Georgia and the South Sandwich Islands. However, small industrial railways operated on the quayside of certain ports in South Georgia, to support the whaling industries in the early 20th century, and some of their remains are still present. Most of these were cable railways hauled by fixed steam engines or sometimes manpowered. The railway at Ocean Harbour is the only one definitely known to have used locomotives, but there may have been others. The rusting remains of an 0-4-0 narrow gauge locomotive is still present at Ocean Harbour. A light railway was also provided at the scientific station of Discovery House during its establishment in 1923–1925.

Railway use began to decline in South Georgia when tractor imports became common in the 1950s. The switch from coal to oil as the fuel running the machinery and generators at the stations may also have been significant. Coal was the bulk of the material that needed transportation. Oil, on the other hand, can be piped to its destination. The body of Ernest Shackleton was carried on the Grytviken light railway when it was taken there for burial in 1922.

== List of rail systems ==
=== South Georgia ===
Location	Operator	Connections	Power	refs
Grytviken	Originally Compania Argentina de Pesca in 1904 but there were many changes of tenant until 1966 when the whaling station closed	Harbour – flensing yards – general settlement A separate line was built to support the building of a dam.	Mix of manual operation and powered winches. Decauville light railway	
Godthul	Supply depot for a whaling ship	There is no rail transport in Godthul		
Husvik	Tonsberg Whaling Co.	Harbour jetty – extensive rail connections around industrial area – residential areas – tradesmen areas (pig pens, butcher, carpenter) – foundry and boat slipways	Possibly locomotives. What may be an engine shed is located near the foundry.	
King Edward Point (administrative centre and scientific station)		Jetty – Magistrate's house – Discovery House – possibly also the radio station		
Leith Harbour	Christian Salvesen		Manual	
Ocean Harbour	AS Ocean of Larvik		Steam locomotives, possibly made by Krauss Locomotive Works	
Prince Olaf Harbour	Southern Whaling and Sealing Company	Piers – whaling factory – tank farm - pig pens. Much of the rails were on elevated tracks.	Stationary steam winches	
Stromness	Sandefjord Whaling Co.	Pier – Factory buildings (this is a small installation, the company did most of its processing on board a factory ship)	Stromness acquired much of the equipment from the Ocean Harbour station when it closed in 1920. It is not known whether this included the locomotives.	

=== South Sandwich Islands ===
A survey station in Southern Thule may transport equipment using the round cross-section rails as used for tracking shots in cinematography. There are otherwise no light railways in the South Sandwich Islands. Southern Thule is a long way south at 59°25′S, but even if its track is counted as a proper light railway, it is not the most southerly ever built. That record is held by the Dumont d'Urville Station in Antarctica at 66°40'S where a narrow gauge track is used to unload material at the jetty.
