= Beach Point =

Headland in the South Sandwich Islands

Beach Point (59°26′S 27°19′W) is the northeast tip of Thule Island, in the South Sandwich Islands, made conspicuous by a bare rock ridge and a narrow beach of boulders and pebbles. It was charted and named in 1930 by DI personnel on the Discovery II who made a landing there.
