= Herd Point =

Herd Point (59°28′S 27°17′W) is a point which forms the west side of Ferguson Bay at the south end of Thule Island, in the South Sandwich Islands. It was roughly charted by a Russian expedition under Fabian Gottlieb von Bellingshausen in 1819–20. It was recharted in 1930 by Discovery Investigations personnel on the Discovery II and named for R.D. Herd of Ferguson Brothers, Port Glasgow, Scotland, the builders of the Discovery II.
