= Telephone numbers in South Georgia and the South Sandwich Islands =

Country Code: +500 (partial)
International Call Prefix:

Telephone numbers in South Georgia and the South Sandwich Islands.

+500 4XXXX
