= Ferguson Bay =

Coordinates: 59°27′29″S 27°18′49″W

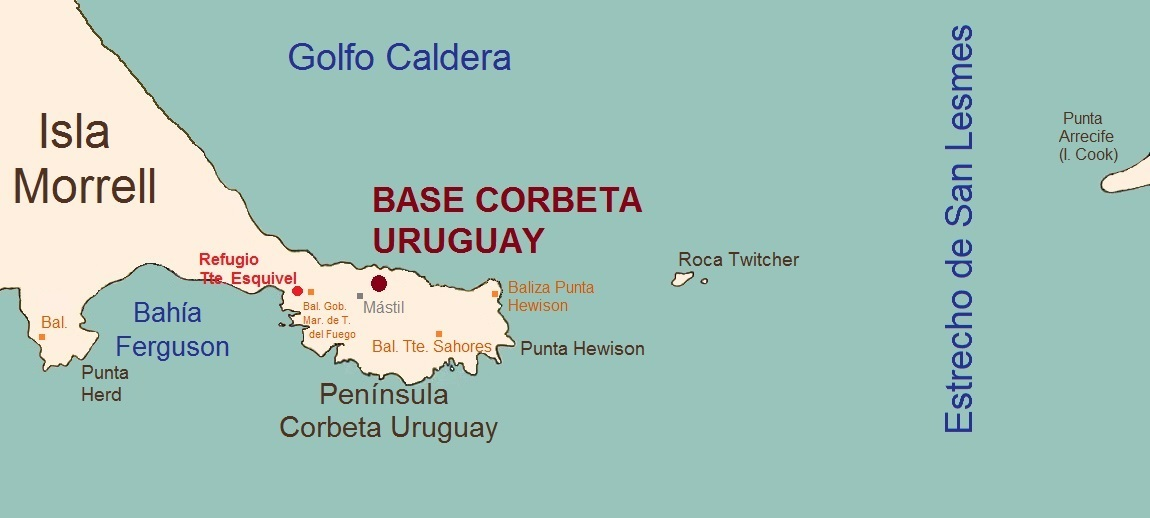
Spamish language map showing Ferguson Bay (Bahia Ferguson).

Ferguson Bay is a small inlet on the south-eastern coast of Thule Island in the Southern Thule island group. It is in effect the only safe anchorage on Southern Thule.

It was here that the Argentine Air Force set up the Corbeta Uruguay base, starting an occupation that lasted from November 1976 to June 1982, when British military forces ended the Argentine presence.

== See also ==
- Herd Point
