= Southern Thule =

Island group in the South Sandwich Islands

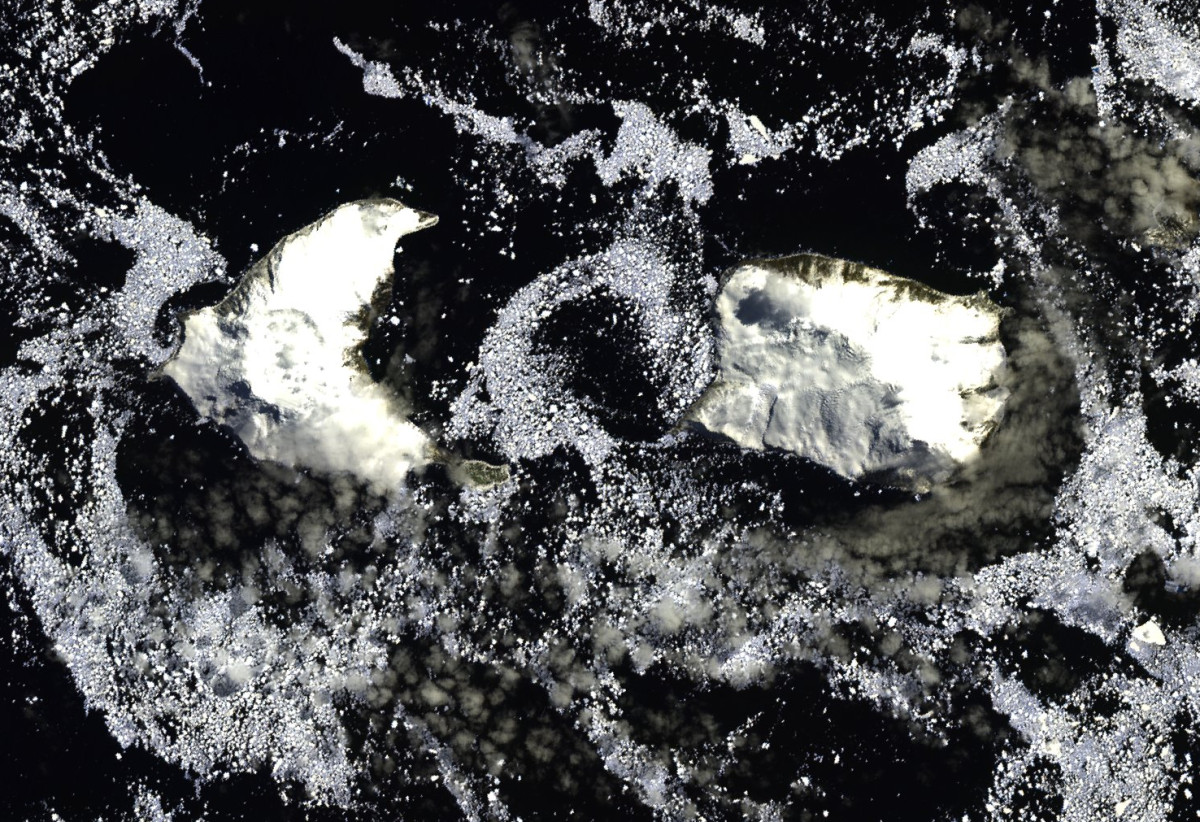
- The western islands of Southern Thule

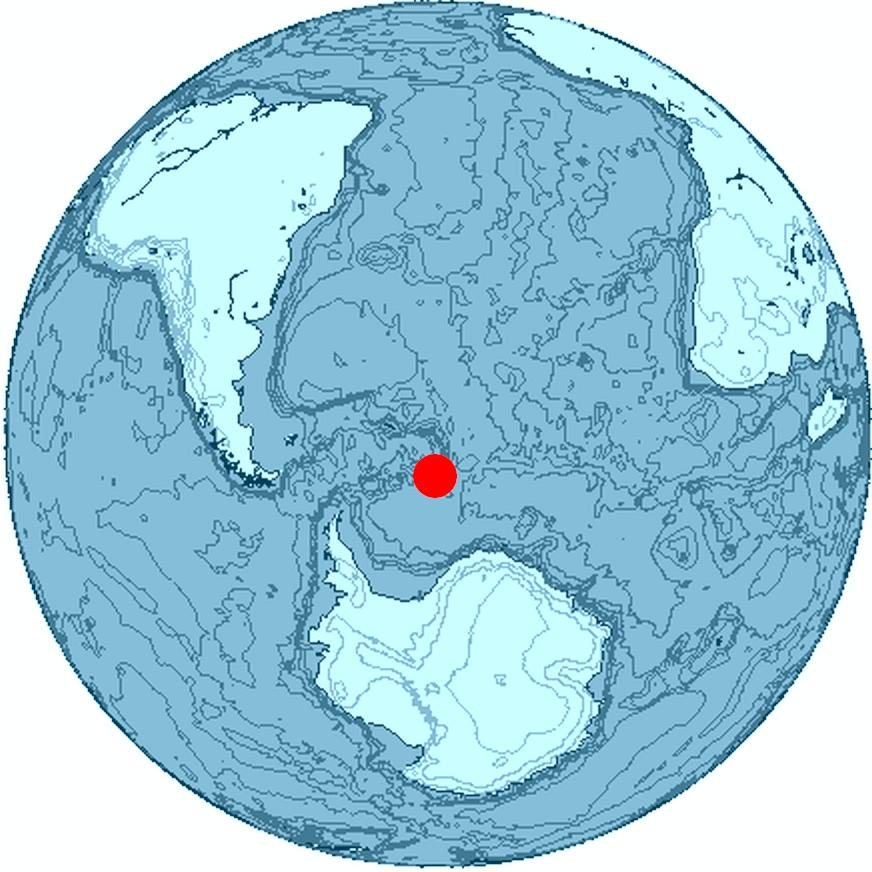

Geography
- Location: Southern Atlantic Ocean
- Coordinates: 59.42°S 27.23°W
- Archipelago: South Sandwich Islands

Administration
- United Kingdom
- South Georgia and the South Sandwich Islands

Southern Thule is a group of the three southernmost islands in the South Sandwich Islands in the southern Atlantic Ocean: Bellingshausen, Cook, and Thule (Morrell). It is a largely submerged volcano of which only the three islands emerge above sea level. Between Cook and Thule, and south of Bellingshausen, lie two submerged calderas; a third caldera is located on Thule. Cook Island is inactive and largely glaciated, while Bellingshausen and Thule feature active craters with fumarolic activity, and evidence of eruptions in the 20th century.

Around the fumaroles, vegetation consisting of mosses and lichens has grown. The islands are populated by penguins and seabirds which breed there. The islands were discovered in 1775 and are uninhabited. They are part of a marine protected area that is part of the British Overseas Territory of South Georgia and the South Sandwich Islands.

== Geography and geology ==
=== Regional ===
Southern Thule is the southernmost island group in the South Sandwich Islands, an archipelago in the Southern Atlantic Ocean. The South Sandwich Islands are a group of eleven volcanic islands, most of which are volcanically active. They are located about 2,000 kilometres (1,200 mi) north of Antarctica and about the same distance southeast from the Falklands Islands. Politically, the South Sandwich Islands are a UK overseas territory and managed as part of the South Georgia and South Sandwich Islands. They were declared a marine protected area in 2012, with additional expansion taking place in 2019.

=== Local ===
The Southern Thule group consists of three islands, the southern-most pair Thule Island and Cook Island, and the smaller Bellingshausen Island to their northeast. They rise from an east–west trending wave-cut platform on top of a broad submerged volcano with a width of 30 kilometres (19 mi), and a length of 63 kilometres (39 mi) at 2,000 metres (6,600 ft) depth. The western side of the volcano has steeper slopes than the eastern side. The flanks of this volcano feature ridges and domes, as well as traces of mass wasting such as chutes. The islands are surrounded by shallow shelves at 120–130 metres (390–430 ft) depth, which probably formed through erosion during glacial periods, when sea levels were lower. Several seamounts lie south and west of Southern Thule, including Kemp Caldera, Adventure Bank and Nelson Seamount.

Bellingshausen and Thule Islands are both simple volcanic cones with a summit crater. The crater on Thule is water-filled, and there is a parasitic vent on the southeastern side of the island. Cook Island is more complex and might consist of multiple volcanic cones. Where there are outcrops, all three islands appear to consist of layers of lava flows and scoria or pyroclastics.

- Bellingshausen Island has dimensions of 1.2 by 1.7 kilometres (0.7 mi × 1 mi), with a north–south orientation. It is roughly triangular with Salamander Point in the north, Hardy Point in the southwest, and Isaacson Point in the southeast. A further pedunculate peninsula juts out from the northeastern side and forms Jagged Point. The coasts are dominated by cliffs, lava shelves and beaches. Inland, slopes and terraces emanate from the summit crater. The highest point of the island is Basilisk Peak; its elevation above sea level is variously given as 182 metres (597 ft) or 253 metres (830 ft). The about 500-metre (1,600 ft) wide summit crater is about 60-metre (200 ft) deep and drained underground. In the cliffs and the crater there are outcrops of lava flows and scoria. Unlike the other two islands, Bellingshausen is almost free of ice, with most of the terrain covered with scoria or lava flows. The ice features crevasses.
- Cook Island has dimensions of 6 by 3.5 kilometres (3.7 mi × 2.2 mi) and is rectangular in shape, extending east–west. The "corners" are formed by the northwestern cape at Tilbrook Point, the northeastern cape at Resolution Point, the southeastern cape at Longton Point and the southwestern cape at Reef Point. There is also an eastern cape at Swell Point and southern one at Jeffries Point. The island is almost entirely surrounded by cliffs, except at narrow locations and where glaciers enter the sea. Mount Holdgate and 1,075-metre (3,527 ft) high Mount Harmer rise on the eastern side of the island, which features several cone-shaped peaks.
- Thule Island has dimensions of 5.2 by 5.4 kilometres (3.2 mi × 3.4 mi) and has a trapezoid shape with the broad side towards the east. The capes of the trapezoid are formed by Cape Flannery to the southwest, Morrell Point to the northwest and Beach Point to the northeast, while the southeastern end has a complex shape: Hewison Point projects far from the coast towards Twitcher Rock, while Herd Point farther south delimits a bay between Hewison Point and Herd Point, Ferguson Bay. The coasts are formed by alternations of ice cliffs, regular cliffs, rocky platforms and rocky shelves, with bouldery beaches providing access to the island. The highest point is 725 metres (2,379 ft) high Mount Larsen. The inland of Thule features a large, 1.7-kilometre (1.1 mi) wide caldera with hints of a 500–600-metre (1,600–2,000 ft) wide inner crater. One observation in 1962 found a 60-metre (200 ft) deep volcanic crater with a green crater lake, which in another survey in 1997 had been replaced by a depression in the ice cover. The two western capes may have been formed by lava flows that exited the caldera on its western side.

Between Cook and Thule Island lies the Douglas Strait with a 4.8 by 4.3 kilometres (3.0 mi × 2.7 mi) caldera at 620 metres (2,030 ft) depth. Elsewhere, the sea between the two islands only reaches depths of 55 metres (180 ft) and the strait is no more than 6-kilometre (3.7 mi) wide, its seafloor covered with sediment. The caldera floor contains a debris mound that may have formed from a landslide at Thule Island. Other features are concentric arches that may indicate that the caldera is nested, and large cones that could be tephra cones. Another submarine caldera is located south of Bellingshausen Island and east of Cook Island; it is named Resolution Caldera and is open to the south. It reaches a depth of 276 metres (906 ft) below sea level, while its eastern rim rises to a depth of 35 metres (115 ft), and has a width of 3–4 kilometres (1.9–2.5 mi). The Douglas Strait caldera has an estimated volume of 9–12 cubic kilometres (2.2–2.9 cu mi) and the Resolution one of 3 cubic kilometres (0.72 cu mi); both may have formed through multiple eruptions.

=== Composition ===
Bellingshausen has produced basaltic andesite, while Cook volcanic rocks range from basalt to dacite and Thule has produced andesite and dacite. Phenocrysts include augite, hypersthene and plagioclase. All volcanic rocks define a predominantly tholeiitic suite, but there are calc-alkaline members. The tholeiitic magmas form through the melting of pyrolite mantle triggered by the entry of water released from the subducted crust in about 80–100 kilometres (50–62 mi) depth. The calc-alkaline magmas form when the subducted crust undergoes a transformation into eclogite-quartz at depths of 100–300 kilometres (62–186 mi), which upon melting yields the calc-alkaline melts. Palagonite tuffs crop out on Bellingshausen and Thule.

== Climate, vegetation and animal life ==
Mean temperatures in the South Sandwich Islands hover around freezing; at Southern Thule they are estimated to range between −1 and −11 °C (30 and 12 °F). Sea ice covers the sea for about three months a year, and wave heights reach 15 metres (49 ft). Winds blow mostly from south and northwest, and frequent extratropical cyclones and storms pass through the archipelago. The sky is usually overcast, with frequent precipitation falling mostly as snow.

Bellingshausen Island is richly vegetated, with mosses and hepatics growing all around the fumaroles and even away from them. They are in turn colonized by collemboles and mites. The plant communities around the fumarolic vents form characteristic concentric populations, while mosses form carpets in gullies. Cook Island by contrast appears to be lacking vegetation entirely, even if lichens may be present, and Thule Island likewise seems to largely lack vegetation except for lichens. The flora resembles that of Antarctic and South Atlantic cold temperate climate zones.

Chinstrap penguins and macaroni penguins nest on Bellingshausen and Thule Island, as well as gulls, skuas, snow petrels and Wilson's petrels. Fur seals and southern elephant seals breed on the islands. Antarctic petrels, Antarctic terns, emperor penguins and king penguins also visit the islands.

The principal animals on the submarine slopes of Southern Thule are annelids, crustaceans, molluscs and nematodes. The shallow waters around Southern Thule provide habitats for sea spiders. The submarine habitat may have been severely impacted by the formation of the Douglas Strait caldera and the eruption that caused it. Presently, frequent mass wasting regularly buries the submarine slopes, devastating faunal communities.

== Eruption history ==
The simple structure of Bellingshausen Island implies it is probably among the most recently formed of the South Sandwich Islands. Thule and Cook Islands probably were once part of a common volcano centered on Douglas Strait, but large parts of both islands formed independently from this common volcano. Some landforms in the caldera are very fresh and may have formed recently. The Douglas Strait caldera may have formed only a few thousands of years ago.

Fumaroles have been observed in the summit craters of Bellingshausen and Thule, while Cook displays no evidence of fumarolic activity. The Bellingshausen fumaroles occur around the southern side of the crater and their vents have various shapes and sizes. Some are surrounded by sulfur deposits. Parts of the island are heated from below. The composition of fumarolic gases at Bellingshausen shows a predominance of water vapor, with lesser quantities of carbon dioxide and traces of hydrogen and hydrogen sulfide.

In 1963, volcanic ash was observed overlying ice on the southwestern side of Thule, perhaps indicating a recent eruption. A similar observation was made with scoria on Thule Island the preceding year, when a secondary crater may have been active. Several craters formed on the southern flank of Bellingshausen Island between 1964 and 1997. Seismic activity has been recorded around Southern Thule. There are no known eruptions at Cook Island nor any recorded hydrothermal activity in Douglas Strait or Resolution caldera.

== Human history ==
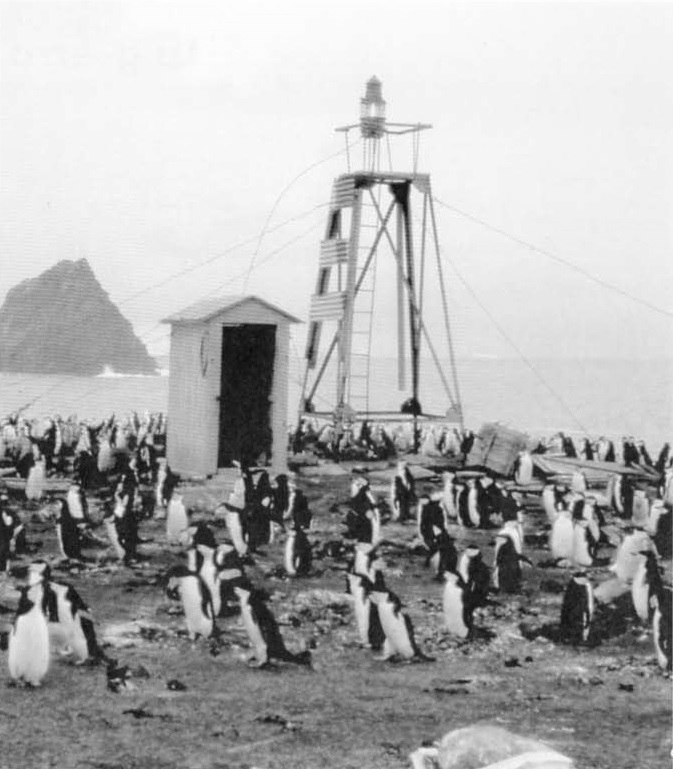
Penguins and human structures at Hewison Point

The South Sandwich Islands were discovered by James Cook in 1775. He also saw the peaks of the Southern Thule group, and named them "Thule" as they were the southernmost land known at that time. The Bellingshausen expedition of 1819 established that "Southern Thule" was a group of three islands, naming one of them Cook Island after their discoverer. Later, the islands were visited by sealers, which may have overexploited the seals of the archipelago, leading to their almost-disappearance. The hostile conditions and remote location mean that they are seldom visited.

=== Occupation ===
In 1954–1956, Argentina built a hut on Thule Island, at Hewison Point, and named it "Teniente Esquivel". It was abandoned following a large eruption on nearby Bristol Island. At the same place, Argentina built a military outpost, "Corbeta Uruguay", and maintained it from 1976 to 1982. Britain discovered the Argentine presence in 1976. The Argentine occupants were removed and the base was destroyed in 1982 as part of Operation Keyhole.
