= Wasp Point =

Headland on Thule Island in the subantarctic

Wasp Point (59°27′44.6″S 27°22′18.7″W) is a projecting point in the middle of the southwest coast of Thule Island, South Sandwich Islands. It was named by United Kingdom Antarctic Place-Names Committee (UK-APC) in 1971 after the American sealing vessel in which Captain Benjamin Morrell of Stonington, CT, visited the island in 1823. Next to Longton Point on Cook Island, it is the southernmost landmass of the South Sandwich Islands and the southernmost landmass worldwide north of the 60th parallel south, and therefore the southernmost landmass outside of the Antarctic Treaty System.
