= Hueca Point =

Hueca Point (58°26′S 26°26′W) is the westernmost point of Montagu Island in the South Sandwich Islands. The name "Punta Hueca" (hollow point) was first used in Argentine hydrographic publications of 1953.
