= Jomfruene =

Three Islands in South Georgia and the South Sandwich Islands, United Kingdom

Jomfruene (54°4′S 38°3′W) is a group of three small tussock-covered islands and a number of barren rocks, lying 1 nautical mile (2 km) west-northwest of Cape Paryadin, South Georgia. The position and number of these islands have been approximated on charts for years. In 1951–52, the South Georgia Survey (SGS) reported that the single large island, shown on charts as "Three Point Island," was known locally as Jomfruene (the maidens). Following more detailed survey by the SGS, 1955–56, it is now known that there are three small islands, not one large one, and the local name has been extended to the group.
