= Morrell Point =

Coordinates: 59°26′S 27°25′W

Morrell Point' is the northernmost point on the west coast of Thule Island in the South Sandwich Islands. It was named by the UK Antarctic Place-Names Committee in 1971 for Benjamin Morrell, a sealer of Stonington, Connecticut, who visited the island in the Wasp in 1823.
