= Thule Island =

Island in the Southern Thule group of the South Sandwich Islands

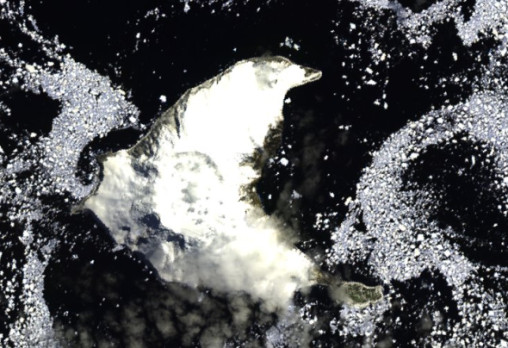
- NASA Terra ASTER image of Thule Island

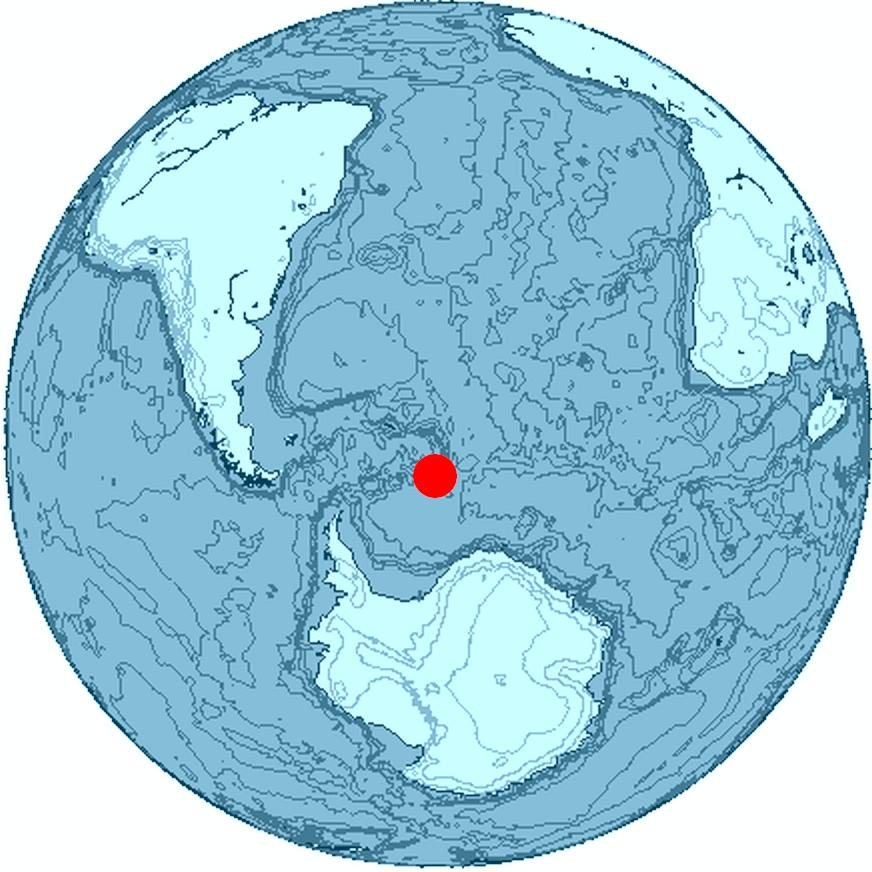
- Location of Thule Island

Geography
- Coordinates: 59.44°S 27.38°W
- Archipelago: South Sandwich Islands
- Area: 5.5 km^{2} (2.1 sq mi)
- Highest elevation: 3,525 ft (1074.4 m)

Administration
- United Kingdom
- South Georgia and the South Sandwich Islands

Demographics
- Population: Uninhabited

Thule Island, also called Morrell Island, is one of the southernmost of the South Sandwich Islands, part of the grouping known as Southern Thule. It is named, on account of its remote location, after the mythical land of Thule, said by ancient geographers to lie at the extreme end of the Earth. The alternative name Morrell Island is after Benjamin Morrell, an American explorer and whaling captain. The island was espied by James Cook and his Resolution crew on 31 January 1775 during his attempt to find Terra Australis.

== Geography ==
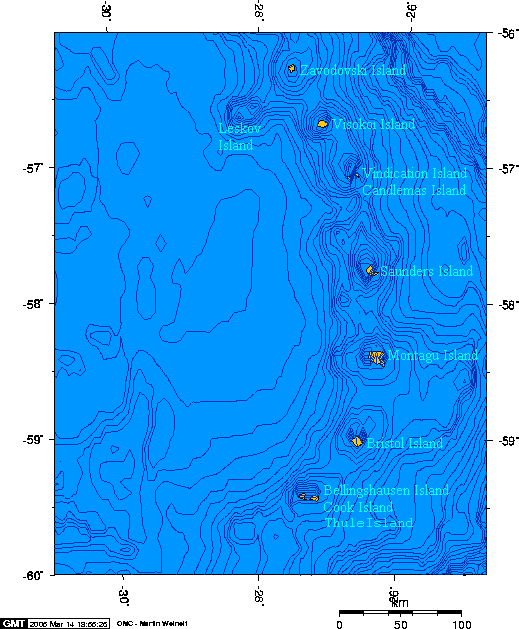
Map of South Sandwich Islands showing location of Thule Island.

Thule Island is roughly triangular in shape and 14 square kilometres (5 1/2 mi^{2}) in area with a long, panhandle-like peninsula called Hewison Point, three kilometres (2 mi), extending to the southeast. Steep slopes ascend to a 1.5-by-2-kilometre (1 by 1 1/4 mi) summit caldera with the peak of Mount Larsen at 710 m (2,329 ft) above sea level. Mount Larsen is named after the Antarctic explorer and whaler Carl Anton Larsen. On the southwestern end lies Wasp Point. Off Hewison Point lies the small islet of Twitcher Rock, the southernmost land on Earth (with the two islets off Cook Island) outside the Antarctic Circle.

Thule Island is the westernmost of Southern Thule island group, which also encompasses Cook Island and Bellingshausen Island. It is thought that Thule and Cook may have been a larger single island in the past, and there is evidence for a submerged crater between the two. Steam from the summit crater lake and ash on the flank were reported in 1962. Volcanic heat keeps the crater on Thule Island free from ice. The peak elevation is 1,074 metres (3,525 ft).

=== Twitcher Rock ===
Twitcher Rock is a rock in the southern part of Douglas Strait, 55 meters high and 140 to 150 meters in diameter, lying 0.7 nautical miles (1.3 km) east of Hewison Point, the southeast point of Thule island. Discovered by a Russian expedition under Fabian Gottlieb von Bellingshausen in 1820, it was charted in 1930 by DI personnel on the British ship Discovery II. They named it for John Montagu, 4th Earl of Sandwich, who was popularly known by the nickname Jemmy Twitcher. With the two islets off Cook Island, it is the southernmost land on Earth outside the Antarctic Circle.

== Argentine occupation ==
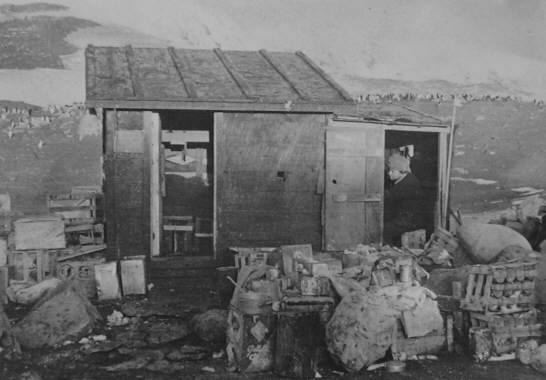
Teniente Esquivel Station, 1955.

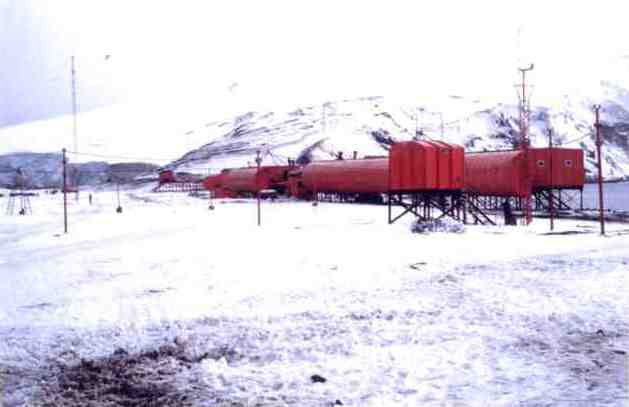
Corbeta Uruguay base, 1981.

Argentina, in order to assert its claim over the South Sandwich Islands, established the summer station "Teniente Esquivel" (es) at Ferguson Bay on the southeastern coast on 25 January 1955. The station had to be evacuated in January 1956 because of volcanic activity on Bristol Island to the north. In 1976 it established a military base on Thule Island called Corbeta Uruguay (Port Faraday) in the lee (southern east coast) of the island. The British discovered the presence of the Argentine base the same year but chose to pursue a diplomatic solution to the issue until the breakout of the Falklands War in 1982. The base was occupied by British forces in the aftermath of the war and eventually destroyed later that year.

== See also ==
- Cape Flannery
- Herd Point
- List of Antarctic and sub-Antarctic islands
- Morrell Point
- Wasp Point
