= Discovery Committee =

The Discovery Committee was a popular name for the Interdepartmental Committee for the Dependencies of the Falkland Islands established by the British Government to carry out scientific investigations (which became known as ‘Discovery Investigations’) and to propose nature resource conservation and economic development policies for the Falkland Islands Dependencies.

During more than 25 years (1925–51) of pioneering work, the Committee's research ships Discovery (Robert Scott’s ship), William Scoresby and Discovery II collected an enormous amount of oceanographic, biological, and geographical data published in 38 volumes, contributing greatly to the knowledge of the world's southern regions. Particularly extensive was the new data related to all aspects of the island of South Georgia. Among the results of the investigations was also the discovery of the natural boundary of Antarctica, the Antarctic Convergence.

== See also ==
- Discovery Investigations
- History of South Georgia and the South Sandwich Islands
