= Corbeta Uruguay base =

Former Argentine military outpost in the South Sandwich Islands (1976–1982)

Coordinates: 59°27′24.3″S 27°18′40.8″W

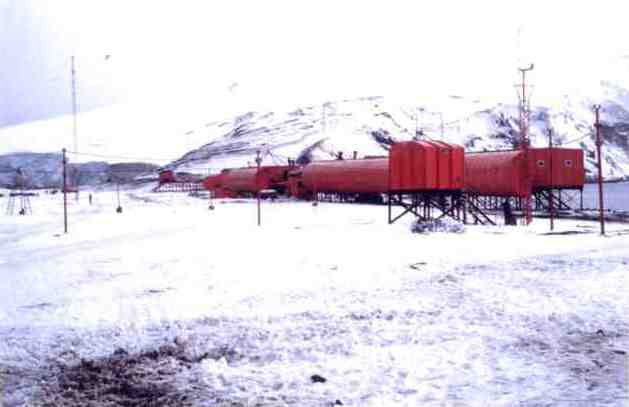
The Corbeta Uruguay station on Southern Thule, 1981

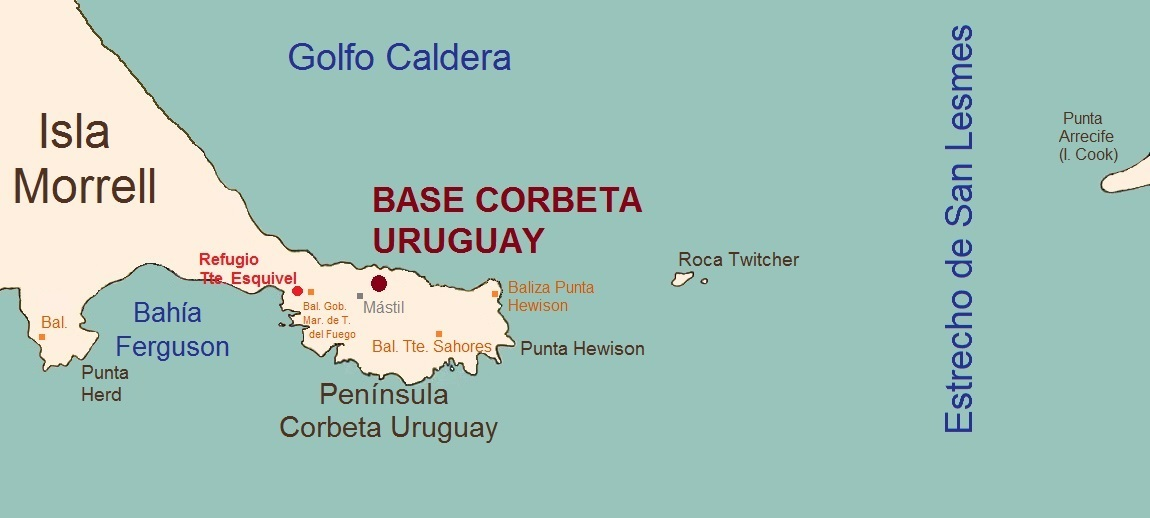
Spanish-language map. Isla Morrell is Thule Island

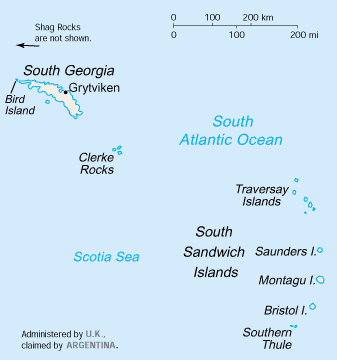
CIA map of South Georgia and the South Sandwich Islands, Southern Thule group are bottom right

Corbeta Uruguay base was an Argentine military outpost established in November 1976 on Thule Island, Southern Thule, in the South Sandwich Islands. It was vacated and mostly demolished in 1982 following Britain's victory against Argentina in the Falklands War.

== History ==
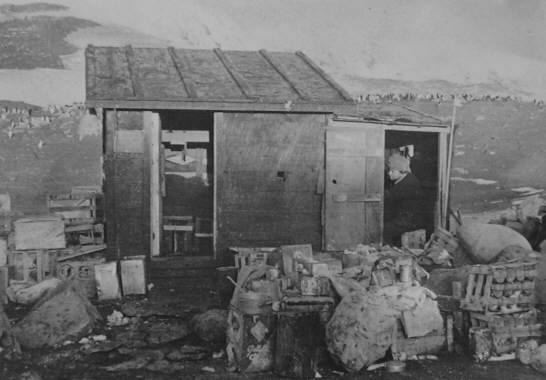
Teniente Esquivel Station in 1955

Earlier, in January 1955, Argentina had established the summer station, Teniente Esquivel, at Ferguson Bay on the southeastern coast. That station was evacuated in January 1956 because of a volcanic eruption on the neighbouring Cook Island.

The Corbeta Uruguay base was established in 1976 by the military dictatorship governing Argentina to reinforce the Argentine territorial claims to British territory in the South Atlantic. The British government became aware of the base in December 1976 but sought a diplomatic solution to the issue until 1982.

Early in the Falklands War, 32 special forces troops from Corbeta Uruguay were brought to South Georgia by the Argentine Navy ship Bahía Paraíso and landed at Leith Harbour on 25 March 1982.

Corbeta Uruguay remained manned by Argentine personnel until 20 June 1982, when British forces sent a task force to end the Argentine presence, after victory over Argentina in the Falklands War. After the garrison at Corbeta Uruguay surrendered, the facility was left unmanned. In December 1982, it was mostly demolished by the Royal Navy after a patrolling warship, HMS Hecate, discovered that someone had taken down the Union Flag from the base flagpole and run up the flag of Argentina.

The base was named after the Argentine corvette, ARA Uruguay, which rescued Otto Nordenskjöld and his crew in 1903 in the Antarctic Peninsula, near the present-day Esperanza Base. That ship is now a floating museum, permanently berthed in Puerto Madero, Buenos Aires.

== See also ==
- History of South Georgia and the South Sandwich Islands
