= RRS Discovery II =

British oceanographic research vessel

History

United Kingdom
- Name: RRS Discovery II
- Operator: Discovery Committee and National Institute of Oceanography
- Builder: Ferguson Brothers, Port Glasgow
- Yard number: 295
- Launched: 2 November 1928
- Completed: November 1929
- Maiden voyage: 14 December 1929 – 31 May 1931
- Out of service: 7 September 1962
- Identification: Official number : 161322
- Fate: Broken up 25 March 1963

General characteristics
- Class & type: Royal Research Ship
- Tonnage: 1036 GRT
- Length: 80 m
- Beam: 11 m
- Draft: 6 m
- Installed power: Triple oil-burning engines
- Propulsion: Single screw
- Speed: 13.5 kn (25.0 km/h)

RRS Discovery II was a British Royal Research Ship which, during her operational lifetime of about 30 years, carried out considerable hydrographical and marine biological survey work in Antarctic waters and the Southern Ocean in the course of the Discovery Investigations research program. Built in Port Glasgow, launched in 1928 and completed in 1929, she was the first purpose-built oceanographic research vessel and was named after Robert Falcon Scott's 1901 ship, RRS Discovery.

== Career ==
The ship's maiden voyage took place from December 1929 to May 1931 and consisted of a hydrographic survey of the South Sandwich Islands. From October 1932 until May 1933 she operated in the Antarctic, calling at South Africa, Australia and New Zealand. Similar voyages took place from 1934 to 1939 during which she supplied the British Graham Land expedition. Her last voyage before the onset of war was from September 1937 to May 1939. In December 1935 and January 1936, the ship was involved in a successful rescue of American polar explorer and aviator Lincoln Ellsworth and his English copilot Herbert Hollick-Kenyon after their aircraft ditched in the Ross Sea near the Bay of Whales.

During the Second World War she served with the Royal Fleet Auxiliary, mainly in the North Atlantic, before resuming her Antarctic survey work after the war ended. Her final Antarctic voyage in the Discovery Investigations series took place from May 1950 to December 1951, in the course of which she circumnavigated the Antarctic continent and discovered four seamounts, three in the Indian Ocean and one in the Pacific Ocean. From 1952 she mainly undertook oceanographical work in the North Atlantic. She was decommissioned in 1962 and broken up the following year.
