= Mathias Point =

Mathias Point (58°28′S 26°14′W) is a point about 1.5 nautical miles (3 km) north of Allen Point, Montagu Island, in the South Sandwich Islands. It was named by the UK Antarctic Place-Names Committee for W.A. Mathias, Royal Navy, a pilot in HMS Protector's ship's flight during the survey of the South Sandwich Islands in 1964.
