= Protector Shoal =

Submarine volcano NW of Zavodovski Island in the South Sandwich Islands

- Summit depth: 55 m (180 ft)
- Height: 3,900 ft (1,200 m)

Location
- Location: 50 km (31 mi) NW of Zavodovski Island
- Group: South Sandwich Islands
- Coordinates: 55°54′45″S 28°10′03″W
- Country: United Kingdom

Geology
- Type: Seamount, Submarine volcano
- Last eruption: 1962; 64 years ago

History
- Discovery date: 1962
- Discovered by: Royal Navy Ice Patrol Vessel HMS Protector

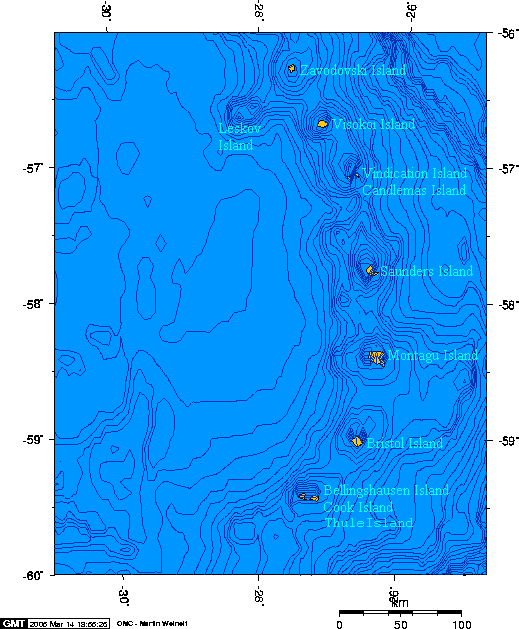
South Sandwich Islands

Protector Shoal is the shallowest point of the Protector Seamounts, a group of submarine volcanoes in the Southern Ocean. They are part of the South Sandwich island arc, a volcanic arc that has given rise to the South Sandwich Islands. Protector Shoal reaches a depth of 55 metres (180 ft) below sea level and is part of a larger group of seamounts that formed atop a larger ridge. Some of these seamounts bear traces of sector collapses, and one is capped by nested calderas.

The seamount erupted in 1962, probably during March, and produced a large pumice raft that was swept by ocean currents around Antarctica. Various islands near to or in the Southern Ocean, such as Australia and New Zealand, have had Protector Shoal pumice wash up on their coastlines. Pumice attributed to this eruption has been recovered as far as Hawaii. There have been no eruptions since, but there is ongoing seismicity and underwater hydrothermal venting.

== Geography and geomorphology ==
The Protector Seamounts are a 55 kilometres (34 mi) east-west trending ridge at 1,000–1,500 metres (3,300–4,900 ft) depth about 56 kilometres (35 mi) northwest of Zavodovski Island. They lie at the northern end of the South Sandwich Islands, a 350-kilometre (220 mi) long north-south trending chain of eleven islands at the eastern margin of the Scotia Sea. From north to south they include Zavodovski Island, Leskov Island, Visokoi Island, Candlemas Island-Vindication Island, Saunders Island, Montagu Island, Bristol Island and Southern Thule (Bellingshausen Island-Cook Island-Thule Island); they are small, lack vegetation and are heavily glaciated. Submarine volcanoes lie at each end of the chain: Protector at the northern, Nelson and Kemp at the southern. The seamount was already known before the 1962 eruption, but received a name only after the eruption.

The northern slopes of the common ridge have a low gradient and are cut by numerous faults associated with the subduction process. The southern slopes are less regular and steeper. Bisco Basin, a 20-kilometre (12 mi) wide embayment, lies north of the ridge. It was originally interpreted as a caldera or a sector collapse scar, but appears to be of tectonic origin. The Nimrod Basin is another tectonic depression. A southeastward extension of the ridge joins Protector Shoal with Zavodovski Island.

The ridge is topped by about seven distinct seamounts that are referred to in the literature as: Tula ("PS1"), Biscoe ("PS2"), "PS3", Protector Shoal ("PS4"), Endurance ("PS5"), JCR ("PS6") and Quest ("PS7"). The names refer to ships. Another seamount, Scoresby, was discovered west of Quest. The seamounts have the sizes of small stratovolcanoes, with heights of about 400–1,400 metres (1,300–4,600 ft), and rise to about a few hundred metres below sea level. The shallowest point of the chain is Protector Shoal which reaches a depth of 55 metres (180 ft) below sea level. Initially it was thought that "Protector Shoal" was a 27-metre (89 ft) deep seamount; subsequently the name was attributed to the shallowest seamount. This seamount is cut by a 2.5-kilometre (1.6 mi) wide slump scar, formed by a collapse that descended to the south-southeast. Another slump is identified on the northwestern side.

Northwest of Protector Shoal is the broad Nimrod Bank, at 400–600 metres (1,300–2,000 ft) depth. JCR also features a collapse scar. Quest is cut by two 3 kilometres (1.9 mi) and 1.6 kilometres (0.99 mi) wide nested calderas that are breached to the southwest, with a maximum depth of 340 metres (1,120 ft). The caldera volume reaches about 0.4–0.9 cubic kilometres (0.096–0.216 cu mi). Lava domes and lava flows, probably from monogenetic volcanoes, have been emplaced south of JCR and west of Nimrod Bank. Dives on to Quest and Protector Shoal have found a seafloor covered with gravel, sediments, talus and volcanic blocks that reach metre sizes. Some areas are sandy, others blocky or gravelly and there are rocky outcrops at Protector and Scoresby.

== Geology ==
East of the South Sandwich Islands, the South American Plate subducts beneath the Sandwich Plate at a rate of about 67–79 millimetres per year (2.6–3.1 in/year), increasing to the south. This subduction is responsible for the volcanism of the South Sandwich arc. The oceanic crust under the arc is young, only about 8–10 million years, and formed on the Scotia spreading ridge west of the South Sandwich Islands. It is a young volcanic arc which produces mainly basaltic rocks, forming 3-kilometre (1.9 mi) high volcanic piles.

At the northern margin of the arc, the subducted oceanic crust is about 76 million years old. Below Protector Shoal, the downgoing South America slab has an east-west trending tear. Fluids ascending through the tear could be enhancing melt production under the seamount.

=== Composition ===
Protector Shoal has erupted rhyolite or rhyodacite, with andesite inclusions. This is the only known occurrence of rhyolite in the South Sandwich Islands. Phenocrysts include amphibole, augite, diopside, ilmenite, orthopyroxene, plagioclase, quartz and titanium-containing magnetite. The rocks define a potassium-poor tholeiitic suite, common on the South Sandwich Islands.

Pumices dredged from the southern flank of Protector Shoal appear to fall into four distinct groups, based on trace element composition, which do not appear to be derived from each other. They may have all formed through partial melting or fractional crystallization of crustal rocks underlying Protector Shoal. The crustal rocks are most likely the product of island arc volcanism rather than spreading at the Scotia Ridge, although the latter possibility cannot be ruled out. Melts derived from subducted sediments played no role in the formation of Protector Shoal magmas.

== Climate and ecology ==
The climate in the region is polar, with frequent snow and storms; mean annual temperatures hover around 0 °C (32 °F). Fishery takes place around the Protector Seamounts, but has been restricted by the 2012 establishment of the South Georgia and South Sandwich Islands marine protected area and as of 2022 by a Benthic Closed Area that disallows all bottom fishing.

Quest, Scoresby and Protector Shoal have been investigated during dives. Bryozoans, crinoids, various species of octocorals, serpulid worms, sponges and starfish colonize exposed rocks. Sea anemones, brittle stars and some sponges live on top or inside of other animals. Holothurians, rattails, sea urchins, shrimps and spider crabs complete the fauna. Above 66 metres (217 ft) depth macroalgae form dense stands on Protector Shoal.

== Eruption history ==
Volcanic activity has formed pillow lavas and lava flows, covered by tephra and material eroded from the volcanoes. The Quest calderas could have formed during a submarine eruption resembling the 1962 eruption. Tula, Biscoe and "PS3" to the east appear to be older centres, and rocks from Quest have an aged appearance. The Nimrod Bank is relatively more recent, and the lack of dropstones in dredges and pumice samples implies that most of Protector Shoal is less than 10,000 years old.

The 1962 eruption is the only recorded eruption. Frequent shallow seismicity at Protector Shoal continued after the eruption, and may indicate renewed eruptions. No evidence of bathymetric changes between 1962 and 1964 has been found. Future eruptions could lead to the formation of an island. There is present-day hydrothermal venting, inferred from temperature anomalies during dives on to Quest caldera, Protector Shoal and Scoresby Seamount. In Quest caldera, microbial mats colonize the surroundings of vent chimneys on the caldera rim, but there is no distinct vent-associated fauna. Thermal anomalies at Protector are concentrated in a small depression in the collapse scar, no vent sites have been identified.

=== 1962 eruption ===
On 14 March 1962 the helicopter of the HMS Protector (A146) encountered a pumice raft around Visokoi, which had probably erupted a few days before. The ship progressed through a denser raft with larger pumice blocks as it sailed north towards and past Zavodovski. The raft consisted of many streams of pumice blocks and covered an area exceeding 5,000 square kilometres (1,900 sq mi). Pumice blocks reached sizes of 1.5 metres (4 ft 11 in). Similar pumices were dredged from the top of Protector Shoal. The pumices have been classified in two groups, a white bubble-rich one and a grey bubble-poor one, with slightly distinct chemical compositions. Larger pumice blocks smelled of sulfur when they were broken open. The total volume of the pumice was about 0.6 cubic kilometres (0.14 cu mi), derived from about 0.2 cubic kilometres (0.048 cu mi) of magma, insufficient to cause caldera formation. The eruption may have decimated the submarine fauna around Protector Shoal.

An earthquake recorded at Protector Shoal on 5 March 1962 may or may not be associated with the eruption. Its epicentre was located just north of the middle portion of the Protector ridge. The occurrence of this earthquake, the position of the pumice raft, the presence of a shallow seamount and the similarity between its rocks and the pumice led to the recognition that the pumice raft had originated at Protector Shoal.

The pumice was carried around Antarctica by the Antarctic Circumpolar Current (ACC) for distances exceeding 20,000 kilometres (12,000 mi), and from there into the South Atlantic, South Pacific and South Indian Ocean. Wind aided in the movement of the larger blocks, which thus advanced more quickly. The pumice reached New Zealand in 1963 or 1964, Tasmania in 1963 or 1964, Victoria and Western Australia in 1964, Southern Australia in 1965. The pumice persisted in the Southern Ocean for more than five years and eventually spread worldwide. Some pumices were captured by the Humboldt Current, getting washed up on Juan Fernandez Islands in 1965, and further into the North Equatorial Current, eventually arriving in Hawaii. A sample of Hawaiian pumice demonstrated that almost 72% of Hawaiian pumices come from Protector Shoal, which was attributed to a sampling issue as Christmas Island has very few Protector Shoal pumices. Other localities with tentative findings of Protector Shoal pumices are Bouvet, the Falklands, Heard Island, Kerguelen, Macquarie Island, Marion Island and South Georgia. Pumice samples derived from Protector Shoal have been recovered from Livingstone Island in the South Shetland Islands and Rio Bueno on Tierra del Fuego at the tip of South America, where they arrived after being carried around Antarctica by the ACC, and are a conspicuous feature of the beaches there.

Large pumice blocks can be colonized by organisms and thus aid their spread. Some pumices after stranding were floated again and thus redeposited, others were picked up and swallowed by birds, being found in their stomachs.

== See also ==
- List of volcanoes in South Sandwich Islands
