= Leeson Point =

Ice-covered coastal feature in South Sandwich Islands named after John Leeson

Leeson Point (58°24′S 26°14′W) is a conspicuous ice-covered coastal feature forming the northeast corner of Montagu Island, South Sandwich Islands. It was named by the UK Antarctic Place-Names Committee for Lieutenant John Leeson, Royal Navy, Senior Pilot in HMS Protector's ship's flight during survey of these islands in 1964.
