= Traversay Islands =

Three northernmost South Sandwich Islands

- The Traversay Islands within the South Sandwich Islands

- Location of the South Sandwich Islands

Geography
- Coordinates: 56°36′S 027°43′W
- Archipelago: South Sandwich Islands

Administration
- United Kingdom

Demographics
- Population: Uninhabited

The Traversay Islands (Spanish: Archipiélago Marqués de Traverse) are a group of three islands—Zavodovski, Leskov and Visokoi—at the northern end of the South Sandwich Islands in the South Atlantic Ocean.

== History ==
The group was discovered in November 1819 by a Russian expedition under Bellingshausen, who named them for Jean-Baptiste Prevost de Sansac, Marquis de Traversay (1754–1831), a French naval officer who joined the Russian navy in 1791, at the request of an émigré Frenchman in Russian service, admiral Nassau-Siegen. He was Minister of Naval Affairs at Saint Petersburg, 1809–28, and chief promoter of Bellingshausen's Antarctic voyage. The name was previously transliterated as Traverse because it was incorrectly thought that the man commemorated was a Russian.

== Geography ==
Zavodovski Island (56°18′S 27°34′W) lies 350 kilometres (217 mi) southeast of South Georgia Island. It is the northernmost of the South Sandwich Islands and the nearest to South Georgia. The island is approximately 5 kilometres (3.1 miles) across with a peak elevation of 551 metres (1,808 feet) above sea level. The stratovolcano Mount Asphyxia dominates the western side of the island while the eastern half is a low-lying lava plain.

Mount Asphyxia is believed to be active with fresh lava reported in 1830 and numerous indications of activity since. Approximately 50% of the island is composed of tephra. The island is home to around two million breeding chinstrap penguins, making it one of the world's largest penguin colonies. Zavodovski Island featured in the initial part of BBC’s Planet Earth II natural history television series, narrated by David Attenborough and first shown in the UK on 6 November 2016. The programme described life in the harsh environment for the 1.5 million Chinstrap penguins – the largest penguin colony in the world.

Visokoi Island (56°42′S 27°12′W), which lies to the southeast of Zavodovski, is 7.2 km (4.5 miles) long and 4.8 km (3 miles) wide, capped by Mount Hodson, a volcanic peak (1,005 m or 3,297 ft). The peak is named after Sir Arnold Weinholt Hodson, a governor of the Falkland Islands. Visokoi means "high". The island's eastern tip, Point Irving, is named for the leader of a British exploratory and mapping expedition, Commander John J. Irving.

Leskov Island (56°40′S 28°10′W) is located to the west of the main arc of the South Sandwich Islands and is less than 1.5 kilometres (0.9 mi) long, and lies 48 km (30 mi) west of Visokoi. It was named by Bellingshausen after the third lieutenant on the expedition ship Vostok. It is composed of andesitic rather than basaltic lava. The subduction zone forming the South Sandwich Trench lies to the east of the island arc.

== See also ==
- List of Antarctic and sub-Antarctic islands
- List of Antarctic islands north of 60° S
