= List of volcanoes in the United Kingdom =

There are no active volcanoes in the United Kingdom of Great Britain and Northern Ireland, although a few do exist in some British Overseas Territories, including Queen Mary's Peak in Tristan da Cunha, Soufrière Hills volcano on the Caribbean island of Montserrat, as well as Mount Belinda and Mount Michael in the British Overseas Territory of South Georgia and the South Sandwich Islands.

The last time that volcanoes were active in what is now the United Kingdom was the early Palaeogene period, just over 50 million years ago (Ma), associated with the opening of the Atlantic Ocean. Modern day hills and mountains within the UK which are sometimes described as extinct volcanoes are usually the deeply eroded roots of volcanoes active in prehistoric times. Some locations popularly believed to be volcanoes, such as The Wrekin, actually have different origins, such as being sites where volcanic material was deposited.

== List ==
Below is a list of extinct volcanoes in the United Kingdom.

=== England ===
Name	Elevation		Coordinates	Last eruption
Name	metres	feet	Coordinates	Last eruption
Bardon Hill	276	912	52°42′52″N 1°19′14″W	570 Ma
Barrow Hill	-	-	52°30′22″N 2°07′34″W	311 Ma
Calton Hill	-	-	53°14′25″N 1°49′23″W	330 Ma
Cawsand volcano	-	-	50°19′52″N 4°12′08″W	280 Ma
The Cheviot	815	2674	55°28′42″N 2°08′44″W	390 Ma
Gurnard's Head	-	-	50°11′30″N 5°35′57″W	400 Ma
Haweswater caldera	-	-	54°31′08″N 2°48′17″W	-
Helvellyn	950	3118	54°31′38″N 3°00′58″W	-
Langdale caldera	-	-	54°25′35″N 03°06′41″W	Ordovician
Lundy (?)	143	369	51°10′48″N 04°40′12″W	50 Ma
Scafells (including Scafell Pike)	978	3209	54°27′15.2″N 3°12′41.5″W	430 Ma
Speedwell vent	-	-	53°20′29″N 1°47′32″W	Carboniferous
Warboys	-	-	52.4°N 0.07°W	Hercynian orogeny

=== Northern Ireland ===
Name	Elevation		Location	Last eruption
Name	metres	feet	Coordinates	Last eruption
Carrickarede	-	-		60 Ma
Giant's Causeway in Northern Ireland	-	-	55°15′00″N 6°29′07″W	Palaeogene
Scawt Hill	378	1240	54°54′38″N 5°54′55″W	-
Slemish	437	1434	54°52′55″N 6°5′49″W	Palaeogene
Slieve Gallion	528	1732	54°44′N 6°46′W	-
Slieve Gullion	573	1880	54°08′N 6°26′W	Palaeocene
Tievebulliagh	402	1319	55.07419°N 6.13302°W	-

=== Scotland ===
Name	Elevation		Location	Last eruption
Name	metres	feet	Coordinates	Last eruption
Anton Dohrn Seamount	-	-	57°30′N 11°00′W	40-70 Ma
Ardnamurchan	-	-	56°44′00″N 5°59′00″W	early Eocene: c.55 Ma
Arthur's Seat in Edinburgh	251	824	55°56′39″N 3°09′43″W	298.9 Ma
Ben Nevis	1345	4411	56°47′49″N 5°00′13″W	298.9 Ma
Cuillin Hills (on Isle of Skye)	992	3,255	57°12′N 6°12′W	43 Ma
Dundee Law extinct volcano in Dundee		500	56°28′11″N 2°59′22″W	443.8
Elie Ness	-	-	56°11′24″N 2°49′24″W	-
Erlend	-	-	61°00′N 0°18′W	58 Ma
Eshaness stratovolcano	-	-	60°29′N 1°35′W	-
Glen Coe Caldera	-	-	56°40′08″N 5°01′34″W	416.0 Ma
Hebrides Terrace Seamount	-	-	56°28′N 10°17′W	48 Ma
North Berwick Law	187	613	56°03′05″N 2°42′58″W	298.9 Ma
Peniel Heugh	237	778	55.5292°N 2.5508°W	-
Buchan-Glenn Fissure System (Rattray)	-	-	-	165 Ma
Rockall	17	56	57°35′46.7″N 13°41′14.3″W	-
Rùm volcano	812	2,664	56°59′38″N 6°20′38″W	-

=== Wales ===
Name	Elevation		Coordinates	Last eruption
Name	metres	feet	Coordinates	Last eruption
Deganwy Castle volcano	110	631	53.2975°N 3.8290°W	-
Conwy Mountain (Mynydd y Dref)	244	801	53°16′59″N 3°51′45″W	450 Ma
Rhobell Fawr	734	2408	52.814°N 3.802°W	-
Snowdon (Yr Wyddfa)	1085	3560	53°4′7″N 4°4′34″W	-
Treffgarne Rocks	-	-	51.8742°N 4.9694°W	Ordovician

== See also ==
- List of volcanoes in Montserrat
- List of volcanoes in South Sandwich Islands
