= Longlow Rock =

Longlow Rock (58°24′S 26°29′W) is a rock 1 nautical mile (2 km) south-southwest of Borley Point and 0.5 nautical miles (1 km) off the west shore of Montagu Island, in the South Sandwich Islands. It was charted and named in 1930 by Discovery Investigations personnel on the Discovery II.
