= Mount Hodson =

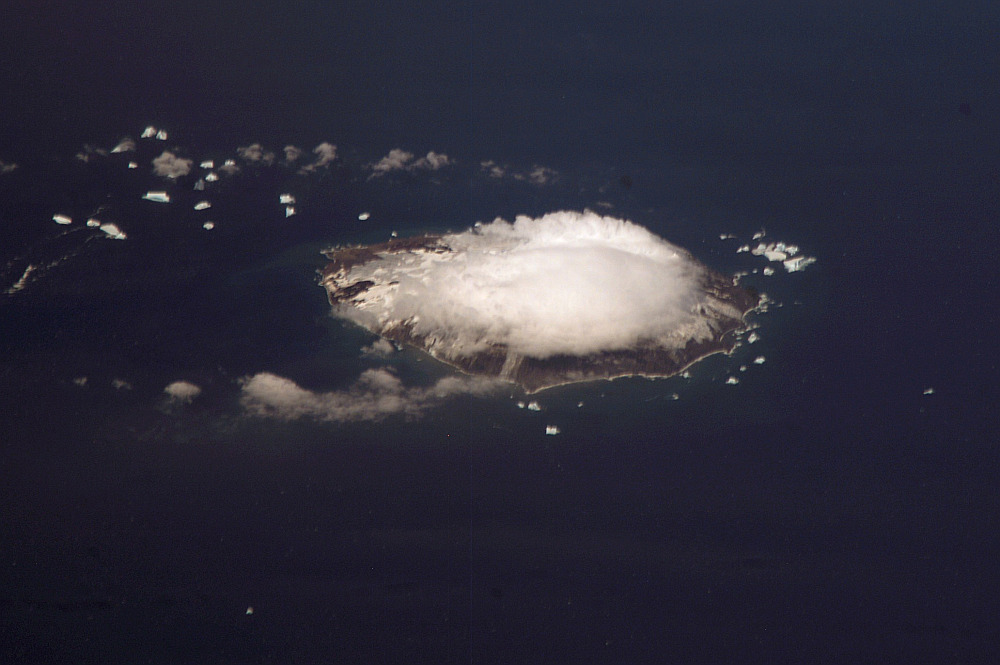
- Aerial photograph of Mount Hodson on Visokoi Island

Highest point
- Elevation: 835 m (2,740 ft)
- Prominence: 835 m (2,740 ft)
- Listing: Ribu
- Coordinates: 56.70°S 27.15°W

Geography
- Location: South Sandwich Islands

Geology
- Mountain type: Stratovolcano
- Last eruption: Unknown

Mount Hodson is an ice-covered stratovolcano and the highest point on Visokoi Island in the South Sandwich Islands with an elevation of 835 m (2,740 ft). It is situated in the north of the South Sandwich Islands and is the southernmost of the Traversay Islands.

The volcano contains numerous scoria cones on the lower flanks of the island. The eruptive history of the volcano is uncertain but there is evidence to suggest eruptions as recently as 1930.

Mount Hodson was named after Arnold Hodson who was governor of the Falkland Islands and Dependencies from 1926 to 1930.

== Geography ==
Mount Hodson is located on the uninhabited Visokoi Island, one of the northernmost South Sandwich Islands and part of South Georgia and the South Sandwich Islands. It is located in the Southern Ocean and, along with Leskov Island, 58 kilometres (36 mi) west of Visokoi, and Zavodovski Island, 45 kilometres (28 mi) north of Visokoi, it forms the Traversay Islands, a subgroup of the South Sandwich Islands.

== Geology ==
Mount Hodson is a stratovolcano – a typically conical volcano characterised by a steep profile with a summit crater and explosive eruptions. It is largely covered in ice and the rounded summit lies west of the centre of the island. A number of basaltic scoria cones – small, steep-sided cones built of loose pyroclastic rock fragments – make up the lower flanks of the island.

Mount Hodson's eruptive history is uncertain. Smoke columns was observed by passing ships in 1930 which may have indicated an eruption.

== Etymology ==
Mount Hodson was named after Arnold Hodson, a British colonial administrator, who served as Governor of the Falkland Islands from 1926 to 1930.

== See also ==
- List of volcanoes in South Sandwich Islands
