= Allen Point =

Allen Point (58°29′S 26°15′W) is the southeast point of Montagu Island, in the South Sandwich Islands. Montagu Island was discovered in 1775 by a British expedition under James Cook, but the point was first mapped by Fabian Gottlieb von Bellingshausen in 1819–20. The point was surveyed in 1930 by Discovery Investigations personnel on the Discovery II and named for H.T. Allen, a member of the Discovery Committee.
