= Borley Point =

Landmark on Montagu Island

Borley Point (58°23′S 26°28′W) is the northwest tip of Montagu Island in the South Sandwich Islands. It was named for John Oliver Borley, a member of the Discovery Committee on Discovery II.

== See also ==
- Longlow Rock, located 1 nautical mile (2 km) south-southwest of Borley Point
