= List of volcanoes in South Sandwich Islands =

This is a list of active and extinct volcanoes in the South Sandwich Islands.

Name	Elevation		Location	Last eruption
Name	meters	feet	Coordinates	Last eruption
Bristol Island	1100	3609	59.03°S 26.58°W	1956
Candlemas Island	550	1804	57.08°S 26.67°W	1911
Mount Hodson	1005	3297	56.70°S 21.15°W	1930
Leskov Island	190	623	56.67°S 28.13°W	Holocene
Mount Michael	990	3248	57.78°S 26.45°W	2005
Mount Belinda	1370	4495	58.42°S 26.33°W	2006
Protector Shoal	-27	-89	55.92°S 28.08°W	1962
Thule Island	1075	3526	59.45°S 27.37°W	1986
Mount Curry	551	1808	56.30°S 27.57°W	2016
