= Zavodovski Island =

Volcanic island in the South Atlantic

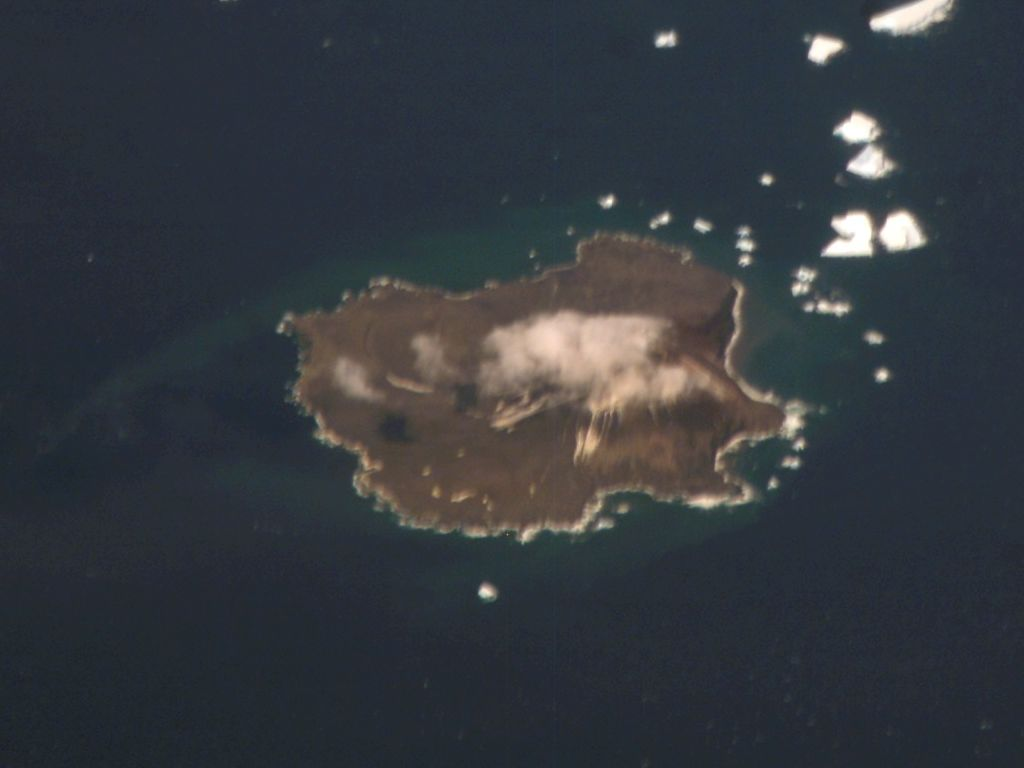
- NASA image of Zavodovski Island (viewed at an angle from the north/northwest)

- Location within Atlantic Ocean

Geography
- Location: Southern Ocean
- Coordinates: 56.30°S 27.58°W
- Area: 25 km^{2} (9.7 sq mi)
- Length: 4 km (2.5 mi)
- Width: 3.8 km (2.36 mi)
- Highest elevation: 551 m (1808 ft)
- Highest point: Mount Curry

Administration
- United Kingdom

Demographics
- Population: uninhabited

Zavodovski Island is an uninhabited volcanic island in the Traversay Islands subgroup of the South Sandwich Islands, which are located southeast of South Georgia in the South Atlantic Ocean. Zavodovski is the northernmost of the South Sandwich Islands and consists of one major stratovolcano, Mount Curry, which is surrounded to the east by a plain formed by lava flows. Mount Curry has a fumarolically active crater on the southwestern side, which also bears traces of a sector collapse. An eruption occurred in 2016.

The island was officially discovered in December 1819 by Thaddeus von Bellingshausen. Zavodovski was formerly home to the largest penguin colony in the world, consisting mostly of chinstrap penguins, though today the colony is mainly made up of macaroni penguins, and is no longer the largest in the world. Early explorers noted the bad smell of the island, which is reflected in numerous placenames.

== Geography and geomorphology ==
Zavodovski is the northernmost of the South Sandwich Islands, which lie southeast of South Georgia in the Southern Atlantic Ocean and extend over a distance of 350 kilometres (220 mi) in north-south direction. Together with Leskov and Visokoi Island, it makes up the Traversay Islands subgroup of the South Sandwich Islands. Politically, South Georgia and the South Sandwich Islands make up the UK Overseas Territory of South Georgia and the South Sandwich Islands. In 2012, a marine protected area was established in the South Sandwich Islands. The scope of the protected area was further expanded in 2019. Icebergs occur in the surrounding waters, and sea ice reaches Zavodovski in August and September.

The island has dimensions of 3.8 by 4.0 kilometres (2.4 mi × 2.5 mi) and a diamond-shaped outline, with northern Reek Point, eastern Pungent Point, southern Fume Point and western Stench Point. Two embayments are located north and northeast of Stench Point between the headlands of Acrid Point and Pacific Point. The coastlines are made up of 15–30 metres (49–98 ft) high cliffs, rock shelves and boulder beaches. Slightly west of the centre of the island lies the 551 metres (1,808 ft) or 557 metres (1,827 ft) high Mount Curry stratovolcano, also known as Mount Asphyxia. A volcanic crater lies on the southwestern flank, and a further buried crater may exist northwest of the summit. Two fumarolically active fissures extend eastward from Mount Curry to two parasitic vents.

The small size of the island prevents extensive glaciation; there are only thin glaciers and snow fields (in 1962, ice area was about 0.1 square kilometres (0.04 sq mi)) and ice is often ash-covered. Except on the western side, where marine erosion has eroded away parts of the island, lava flows surround most of Mount Curry. On the eastern side of the island, they form a gently undulating plain that is easily traversable and accessible from the sea, by humans and penguins alike. This asymmetry is probably due to the preferential emission of lava flows on the eastern side. Lava flows feature columnar joints that are visible in coastal cliffs. On the western side, cliffs show traces of a sector collapse, which extended below sea level and left a 4 cubic kilometres (0.96 cu mi) deposit on the seafloor.

A 6 kilometres (3.7 mi) wide submarine shelf surrounds Zavodovski at a depth of 70–160 metres (230–520 ft) on all sides except the western, where it has been removed by the sector collapse. The shelf probably formed through marine erosion during glacial sea level decrease. The island lies on the western one of a pair of submarine ridges, which have a width of 54 kilometres (34 mi) at 1,800 metres (5,900 ft) depth and form an edifice with a total volume of about 5,400 cubic kilometres (1,300 cu mi). Their margins are cut by chutes and slump scars; the bathymetry is irregular. Protector Shoal is 56 kilometres (35 mi) northwest of Zavodovski, and connected with it by a submarine ridge at less than 1 kilometre (0.62 mi) depth. In 1962, a submarine eruption produced a pumice raft that reached New Zealand. Another, deeper, submarine ridge connects Zavodovski to Leskov Island to the southwest.

== Geology ==
East of the South Sandwich Islands, the South America Plate subducts beneath the Scotia Plate at a rate of 70 millimetres per year (2.8 in/year). The subduction is responsible for the existence of the South Sandwich island arc, which is constituted by about eleven islands in an eastward curving chain, and submarine volcanoes such as Protector in the north and Adventure and Kemp in the south. From north to south Zavodovski, Leskov Island, Visokoi Island, Candlemas Island-Vindication Island, Saunders Island, Montagu Island, Bristol Island-Freezland Rock, Bellingshausen Island, Cook Island-Thule Island emerge from the sea. Most of the islands are stratovolcanoes of various sizes.

=== Composition ===
Basalt is the dominant rock produced by volcanic activity and defines a potassium-poor tholeiitic suite. Phenocrysts include augite, clinopyroxene, olivine and plagioclase. Compositional patterns at Zavodovski and Protector Shoal resemble those of Candlemas Island. Intense weathering gives the rocks yellow and red colours.

== Flora and fauna ==
Mosses grow on Zavodovski, and algae in proximity to penguin colonies. Unlike other islands in the South Sandwich Islands, vegetation is rare even around fumaroles. It consists of bryophytes. Arthropods include mites. At least one new bivalve species has been discovered at Zavodovski.

Zavodovski supports a population of around 402,000 chinstrap penguins and around 436,000 macaroni penguins, making it the second largest macaroni penguin colony in the Scotia Sea. King penguins also visit the island and are known breed there in small numbers, as well as gentoo penguins. The penguin colony is large enough to cause substantial ammonia emissions in the region. Other seabirds breeding on Zavodovski include Antarctic fulmars, Antarctic terns, black-bellied storm petrels, blue-eyed shags, cape petrels, kelp gulls, snow petrels, southern giant petrels and Wilson's storm petrels. Antarctic fur seal colonies occur along the coasts.

Zavodovski Island was formerly the home of the world's largest penguin colony, consisting of around 1.09 million chinstrap penguins and around 338,000 macaroni penguins. Between 2011 and 2025, the chinstraps suffered a 63% decline in population on Zavodovski, with the colony losing more than 680,000 chinstraps. The macaroni population increased to 436,000 between 2011 and 2016 before stabilizing, or a 28% increase. The decline in chinstraps is credited to a climate-induced southwards contraction of Antarctic krill. This decline has caused Zavodovski to lose its status as the largest penguin colony in the world, a title now given to the Cape Adare Adélie penguin colony.

== Geologic history ==
Zavodovski has erupted during the Holocene, though its rocks have not been radiometrically dated. Alternating sequences of lava flows and tephra built the island up during the last few tens of thousands of years, and were more recently buried by ash fallout. The eastern submarine ridge is covered by sediment and appears to be older, indicating that volcanism has moved westward over time. If glaciers developed on Zavodovski during the Last Glacial Maximum, the steep submarine slopes would have restricted their expansion.

The island is one of the most active volcanoes in the South Sandwich Islands. It was reported to be smoking by von Bellingshausen, who observed emissions from the crater and noted a smell of sulfur, and there are frequent reports of steam emission. Reports of eruptions in 1823, 1830 and 1908 may refer to fumarolic activity. In 1830 fresh lava and floating pumices were reported from the eastern side, and a ship reported an eruption column in 1970. In March 2016, an eruption produced a volcanic cloud and fallout of ash and lava bombs, covering parts of the island and leading the government of South Georgia to issue a navigation warning. Reported inconsistencies of the height of Mount Curry may indicate volcanic activity that changed the summit elevation of the volcano. Undamaged penguin bodies buried by volcanic ash have been found, and activity may have obliterated breeding seabird colonies.

Fumarolic activity occurs in the southwestern crater and extends to the cliffs on the sea, south of Acrid Point. The fumarolic vents have deposited sulfur in the crater. There are conflicting reports of emissions on the eastern and southern side of Zavodovski. Volcanic heat is visible from satellite images, and keeps certain parts of the island snow-free. Emissions from Mount Curry alter the properties of clouds in the area, making them brighter.

== Research history and naming ==
Seal hunters may have visited Zavodovski and the other Traversay Islands before 1819. The official discovery was by Thaddeus von Bellingshausen in December 1819. He sent a landing party ashore and named the island after the captain-lieutenant of his ship Vostok. The correct transliteration would be Zavadovskiy, but the older transliteration Zavadovski is the common one. The Traversay Islands were named after Marquis de Traversay who sponsored the Bellingshausen expedition. Other names of the island are Zawadowski, Ssawadowski, Sawadowsky and Prince Island.

The South Sandwich Islands probably are not visited more frequently than a few times per year. Initially, sealers came to the islands, while whalers hunted in the surrounding seas. Scientific expeditions took place in 1930 and 1962. Zavodovski is probably the most frequently visited of the South Sandwich Islands, with cruise ships approaching to view the penguin colonies and tourist boats landing.

The South Sandwich Islands are uninhabited and remote; South Georgia is the closest inhabited place 250 kilometres (160 mi) northwest from Zavodovski. Argentina installed the Guardiamarina Lamas beacon on Zavodovski; presently, an unmanned weather station on the island is operated by South Africa. Politically, South Georgia and the South Sandwich Islands make up the UK Overseas Territory of South Georgia and the South Sandwich Islands. In 2012, a marine protected area was established in the South Sandwich Islands. The scope of the protected area was further expanded in 2019. Argentina had laid claim to the islands in 1957, in reaction to a Soviet landing on Zavodovski.

=== Smell ===
Early discoverers remarked on the intense smell of the island, which has been referred to as "the world's smelliest", and numerous placenames on Zavodovski reference the smells and noxious fumes: Acrid Point, Fume Point, Noxious Bluff, Pungent Point, Reek Point and Stench Point. (Note: According to GNIS) Von Bellingshausen attributed it to penguin droppings, which forced his landing party to leave the island. Noxious fumes also originate from the fumaroles. The same odour may have poisoned Carl Anton Larsen during his 1908 visit and forced him off the island. Later reports noticed the smell several miles offshore.
