= Asphyxia (disambiguation) =

Asphyxia is a condition of deficient supply of oxygen to the body.

It may also refer to:

- Mount Asphyxia
- Asphyxia (film), a 2017 Iranian neo-noir film
- "Asphyxia", a song by The Network from the 2020 album Money Money 2020 Part II: We Told Ya So!
- Asphyxia (author)
