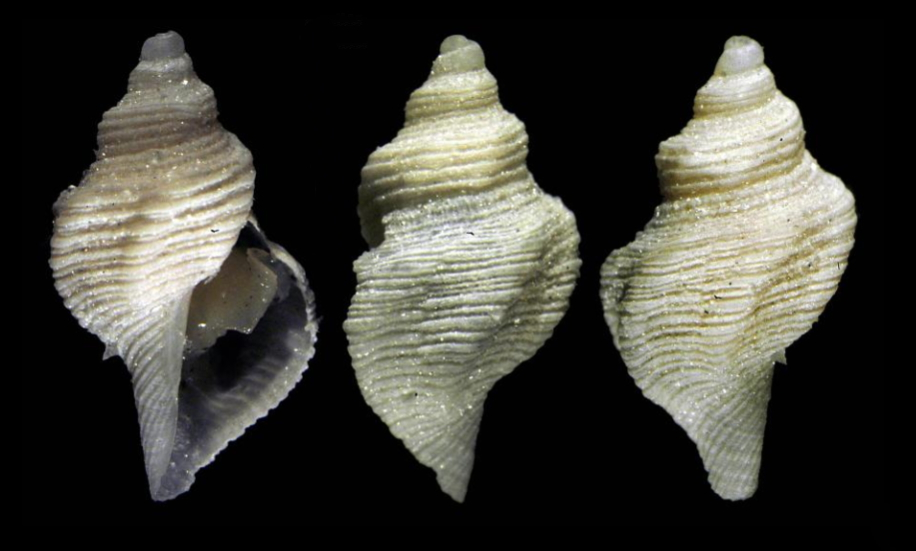
- Shell of Pleurotomella rossi (specimen at the Smithsonian Institution)

Scientific classification
- Kingdom: Animalia
- Phylum: Mollusca
- Class: Gastropoda
- Subclass: Caenogastropoda
- Order: Neogastropoda
- Superfamily: Conoidea
- Family: Raphitomidae
- Genus: Pleurotomella
- Species: P. rossi

Binomial name
- Pleurotomella rossi Dell, 1990

Synonyms
- Pleurotomella (Anomalotomella) rossi Dell, 1990

= Pleurotomella rossi =

Species of gastropod

Pleurotomella rossi is a species of sea snail, a marine gastropod mollusk in the family Raphitomidae.

== Description ==
The length of the shell attains 11.9 mm.

== Distribution ==
This species occurs in the Ross Sea, Antarctica and off Visokoi Island, SE of island, South Sandwich Islands, South Atlantic Ocean at a depth between 93 mm and 121 m.
