= Arnold Hodson =

British Colonial Governor

Sir Arnold Wienholt Hodson KCMG
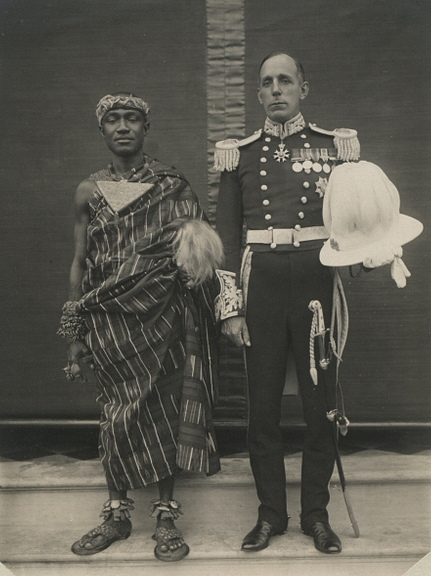
- Hodson with the Asantehene Prempeh II, in 1935

Governor of the Falkland Islands
- In office 1926–1930
- Monarch: George V
- Preceded by: John Middleton
- Succeeded by: James O'Grady

Governor of Sierra Leone
- In office 1931–1934
- Monarch: George V
- Preceded by: Joseph Aloysius Byrne
- Succeeded by: Henry Monck-Mason Moore

Governor of the Gold Coast
- In office 1934–1941
- Monarchs: George V Edward VIII; George VI
- Preceded by: Shenton Thomas
- Succeeded by: Alan Burns

Personal details
- Born: 12 February 1881 Bovey Tracey, Devonspire, [ngland
- Died: 26 May 1944 (aged 63) New York City, U.S.
- Relations: Arnold Wienholt (2nd Cousin); Arnold Wienholt Sr. Edward Wienholt

Sir Arnold Wienholt Hodson KCMG (12 February 1881 – 26 May 1944) was a British colonial administrator who was Governor in turn of the Falkland Islands, Sierra Leone and the Gold Coast.

== Background ==
Hodson was born in Bovey Tracey, Devonshire, in 1881, the eldest son of Algernon Hodson and Sarah Wienholt. He was educated at Felsted. Hodson was in Central Queensland visiting the Wienholt Estates 1900 to 1902 and was part of the Queensland Contingent for South Africa in 1902. He served in the Transvaal from 1902 to 1904. From 1904 until 1912 he was in the Bechuanaland Protectorate Police Force. His duties as a policeman and magistrate took him into the most remote parts of the territory, one of his missions being the Damaraland frontier at the time of the Herero and Nama Wars in German South-West Africa. He was also much involved in trying to reconcile conflicts between tribal chiefs. His several political missions cover a most important period of the history of Botswana.

One of his journeys, in 1906, was made in the company of Sir Ralph Williams, Resident Commissioner, and was from Serowe to Livingstone and the Victoria Falls via Lake Ngami. Four years later Hodson organised a hunting trip for British High Commissioner Selborne, from Pandamatenga to Selous' old camp on the Mabebe Flats and on to the Chobe. Hodson then went on to Somaliland (1912–1914). He served as Consul in Southern Abbysinia from 1914 to 1923, then as Consul in South West Abbysinia from 1923 to 1926.

== Colonial governor ==
Hodson was Governor of the Falkland Islands (1926–1930). During his tenure, a mountain - Mount Hodson (56°42'S, 27°13'W), the summit of Visokoi Island in the South Sandwich Islands - was named after him.

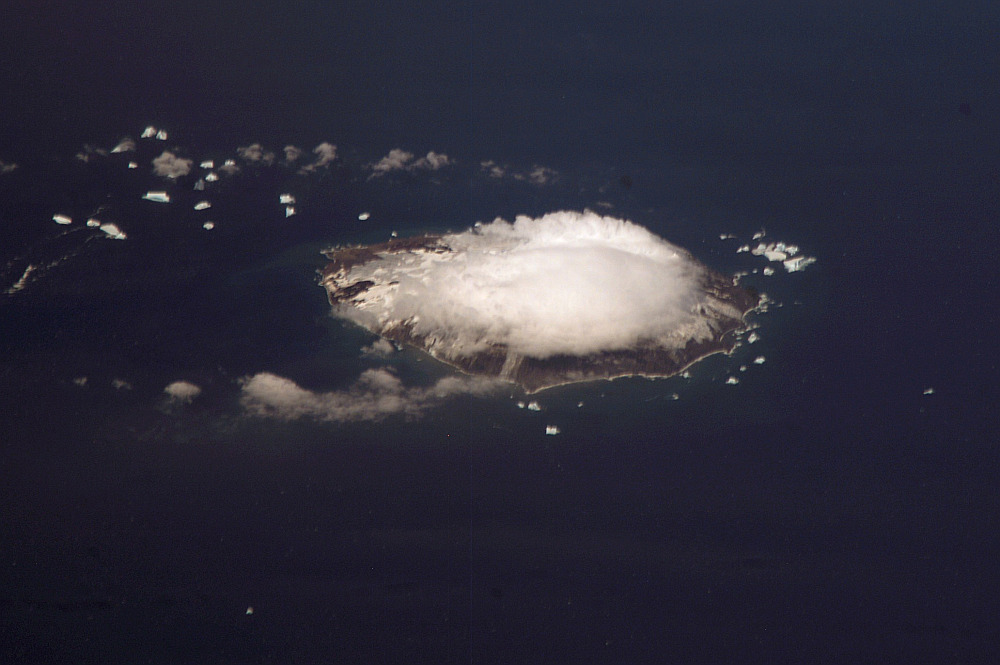
Mount Hodson

The most notable achievement of Hodson's reign as governor of the Falkland Islands was the development of radio communications within and beyond the islands. Working with the BBC, he connected the islands to the imperial broadcasting network. He also established a radio station in the islands. When he later moved to Sierra Leone and the Gold Coast, he continued work on his visions of establishing effective communication lines between various parts of the British Empire.

From 1930 to 1934 he was Governor of Sierra Leone, where he was known as the "Sunshine Governor" and was responsible for the creation of the Sierra Leone Broadcasting Service, which launched on 7 May 1934. He encouraged African participation in government and had Sierra Leone "natives" trained to do jobs that had previously been reserved for bureaucrats who were imported into the colony from Britain. That same year he was knighted. Finally, he was Governor of the Gold Coast (now Ghana) from 1934 to 1941, and was the impetus behind the introduction of the Gold Coast Broadcasting System (now Ghana Broadcasting Corporation).

Hodson married Elizabeth Charlotte Sarah Hay, daughter of Major Malcolm Vivian Hay, in 1928. They had two daughters, Rosemary and Elizabeth. He died on 26 May 1944 in New York City, aged 63.

== Selected bibliography ==
Arnold Hodson was the author of a number of books, including:

- Trekking the Great Thirst: Travel and Sport in the Kalahari Desert. London: T.F. Unwin, 1912.
- An Elementary and Practical Grammar of the Galla or Oromo Language. London: Society for Promoting Christian Knowledge, 1922.
- Seven Years in Southern Abyssinia. [London]: T.F. Unwin, 1927.
- Where Lion Reign: an account of lion hunting and exploration in South West Abyssinia. London: Skeffington and Son Ltd, 1929.

Hodson also wrote a play called The Downfall of Zachariah Fee, or "The Troubles of Santa Claus".
