= Mount Oceanite =

Mountain in the South Sandwich Islands

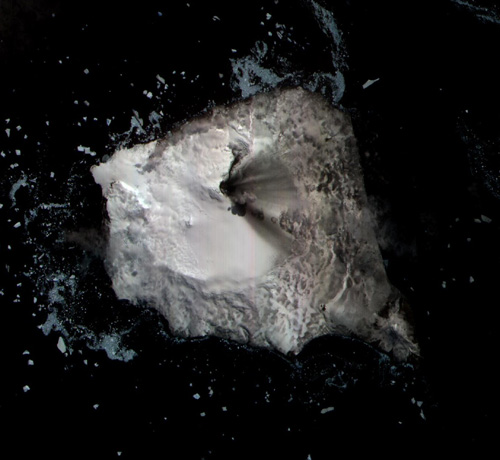
NASA satellite image of Montagu Island, South Sandwich Islands.

Mount Oceanite (58°29′S 26°15′W) is a conspicuous ice-covered mountain (probably an extinct volcano) rising to 915 m (3,002 ft) in the extreme southeast corner of Montagu Island, which is the largest of the South Sandwich Islands, located in the Scotia Sea off the coast of Antarctica.

The name, applied by United Kingdom Antarctic Place-Names Committee (UK-APC) in 1971, refers to the oceanite lavas present in this area, which occur nowhere else in the South Sandwich Islands.
