= Jean Baptiste, marquis de Traversay =

French naval officer (1754–1831)

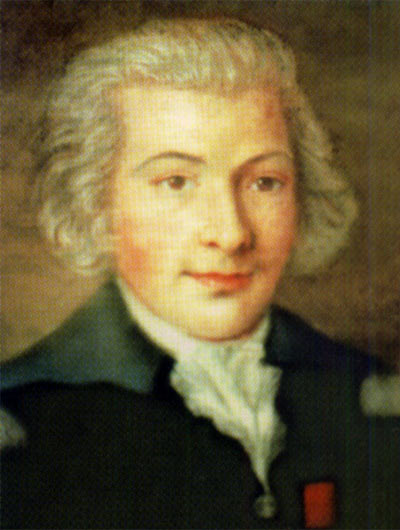
- Born: 24 July 1754; Martinique
- Died: 19 May 1831 (aged 76)
- Military career
- Allegiance: France; Russia
- Branch: French Navy; Imperial Russian Navy
- Rank: Admiral

Jean Baptiste Prevost de Sansac, marquis de Traversay (24 July 1754 – 19 May 1831) was a naval officer of French Creole origins who distinguished himself in the ranks of the Royal French Navy during the American Revolutionary War. In 1791, fleeing from the French Revolution, Traversay joined the Imperial Russian Navy, rising to commander-in-chief of the Black Sea Fleet in 1802. In 1809 he was appointed Minister of the Navy, which position he held for 18 years. His name was frequently russified to Ivan Ivanovich de Traversay (Russian: Иван Иванович де Траверсе).

Traversay is commemorated internationally in the name of the Traversay Islands and in the sarcastic Russian name for the shallow Neva Bay – the Marquis Puddle (Russian: Маркизова лужа).

== Biography ==
=== Early years ===
Jean-Baptiste Prevost de Sansac de Traversay was born in the French Caribbean island of Martinique, the first of nine children of Jean-Francois and Claire de Traversay. His father, Jean-Francois chevallier de Traversay, was a French Navy lieutenant stationed in Martinique who later became a military governor of the island. Jean-Francois's mother owned sizable sugar cane plantations and came from an old naval family named Duquesne; her direct ancestry included captain-armator Abraham Duquesne and admiral Abraham Duquesne-Guitton. The title of Prevost de Sansac de Traversay traces back to chevallier Hugh Prevost (d. 1086).

Jean-Baptiste was five years old when he arrived in France in 1759. His father first placed him in a Benedictine boarding school in Sorèze. In 1766 Jean-Baptiste joined the Navy college in Rochefort; when this college was closed, his class continued their training in Brest.

Traversay was commissioned an enseigne de vaisseau in 1773 and spent three years sailing on transport ships to and from the Caribbean islands. After a brief stay in Rochefort, where he joined the Free Masons and temporarily commanded a company of marines protecting the coast from British incursions, Traversay was assigned to the fleet of admiral d'Orvilliers.

=== American Revolutionary War ===
In May 1778, when France and the United States signed the Treaty of Alliance, war with Britain became imminent. On 15 June 1778, Traversay joined the crew of Vengeur, a 64-gun ship of the line under the command of captain Guy de Kersaint. On 8 July, the French fleet sailed into the Atlantic Ocean with orders to engage the British Royal Navy and cooperate with American forces. Soon Traversay saw his first actual combat in the Battle of Ushant, an inconclusive fleet action. Vengeur subsequently captured the British privateer St. Peter, and Traversay delivered the prize back to Rochefort. Two weeks later, he sailed to the Antilles again, this time as first officer of the frigate Iphigénie, under the command of Armand de Kersaint, which joined the fleet of admiral d'Estaing.

On 14 December 1778, Iphigénie captured HMS Ceres, a new 18-gun British sloop; the French Navy took her in service as Cérès. Cérès became Traversay's first command. In the next year Cérès captured several British ships. In September 1779, Cérès was in action in an abortive landing at Savannah, in April and May 1780 in the Battle of Martinique, and in two subsequent clashes between the fleets of admirals d'Estaing and Rodney.

In March 1781 Traversay assumed command of Aigrette, a fast 26-gun frigate assigned to the fleet of admiral de Grasse. Aigrette's tasks in this campaign ranged from screening Rodney's movements to running shipments of gold from Havana (Spain was subsidizing the French campaign in West Indies). On 30 August 1781 the French fleet arrived at Chesapeake Bay. French troops disembarked to encircle the British army of General Lord Cornwallis. Aigrette, stationed at Cape Henry, captured two sloops, a brig, and a 20-gun corvette. In the morning of 5 September, Aigrette was the first French ship to detect the approaching fleet of admiral Graves. The subsequent Battle of the Chesapeake was a strategic defeat for the British. Soon after the battle, Aigrette seized HMS Iris, a 34-gun frigate (originally the USS Hancock, which the British had captured in 1777). Traversay assumed command of Iris, leaving Aigrette in the hands of her first officer.

In the last months of the war Iris took part in the Battle of St. Kitts. On the eve of the Battle of the Saintes, de Grasse detached Iris to convoy unarmed troop transports. Iris completed her mission while the main French fleet suffered a crushing defeat. In the late stages of war Iris continued reconnaissance, bounty hunting, and finally performed a diplomatic mission, bringing an offer of a ceasefire to British-occupied New York. Traversay was honored with the French Order of Saint Louis (awarded before the defeat at the Saintes), and a membership in the American Society of the Cincinnati. He became captain of the first rank in 1786, at the age of only 32.

=== Russian Baltic Fleet ===
At the outbreak of French Revolution Traversay was stationed in his home Martinique as captain of Active. When news of the fall of the Bastille reached the island, local French troops revolted and were repatriated to Lorient on Traversay's Active. Back in France, the French Navy was falling apart too; Traversay took a long leave, sending his family to a safe place in Switzerland.

In 1790 empress Catherine, fearing a Swedish-British alliance, transferred officers of English descent to the Black Sea fleet, creating a void in the Baltic Fleet. In 1791 Traversay received an invitation to enter Russian service, signed by an émigré Frenchman - admiral Nassau-Siegen; king Louis XVI approved the move, and in the spring of 1791 Traversay arrived in Saint Petersburg. He was created major general and rear admiral of Russian Empire, and placed in command of a galley flotilla, subordinate to Nassau-Siegen.

This commission did not last long, due to strong anti-French feelings among Russians committed to following the model of the British Royal Navy. By summer 1791 Britain was not seen as an imminent enemy anymore and the Englishmen returned to Saint Petersburg. Nassau-Siegen and Traversay became unwanted guests; in August 1791, Traversay left Russia for Coblenz, to serve as liaison between Catherine and the Army of Condé.

After two years with the émigrée forces, in July 1793 he returned to Russia with his family. In 1795 Traversay was appointed commander of a flotilla based in Rochensalm (present-day Kotka in Finland); from 1797 he was also the military governor of Rochensalm, responsible for building and managing this naval fortress, recently annexed from Sweden. Emperor Paul I valued Traversay's service, and, unlike many contemporary soldiers, Traversay enjoyed Paul's good disposition throughout his short reign. Paul's successor, Alexander I, too valued Traversay.

=== Black Sea Fleet ===
In 1802, Alexander promoted Traversay to full admiral and appointed him commander-in-chief of the Black Sea Fleet and the governor of Kherson Oblast. Eventually, Traversay got rid of the civil assignment, but retained authority over the naval bases of Nikolaev and Sebastopol. The combat core of Black Sea fleet, under admirals Ushakov and Senyavin, was based in Mediterranean island of Corfu, and Traversay's role was restricted to administering emerging naval bases and supplying the Corfu fleet. These two functions conflicted with each other; funds allocated for bases in Russia were consumed by the Corfu fleet and the bills of the fledgling Septinsular Republic.

Traversay's only combat operation of this period, the last in his life, was the siege and destruction of Anapa in April 1807 (see Russo-Turkish War (1806–1812)). A force of four ships-of-the-line (all that was left n home waters), under the command of admiral Pustoshkin, with Traversay on board, fired on the rebel fortress at point-blank range. After the rebels abandoned Anapa without fighting, Russian infantry razed the fortress to the ground. A second similar operation, against Trabzon, was detected early by the Turks and was cancelled before the first shots could be fired.

In July 1809 Traversay received orders to transfer command of the Black Sea fleet to Duc de Richelieu and admiral Yazykov, and to return to Saint Petersburg as soon as possible to replace Minister of the Navy, admiral Pavel Chichagov.

=== Minister of Russian Navy ===
Between 1809 and 1812, Traversay's main tasks were improving shipbuilding and coastal defences in the Baltic Sea. He reorganized the Baltic fleet structure (over 32 000 men), creating the system of permanent regiment-sized units (fleet crews, Russian: флотские экипажи) that supplied manpower to ships and ground forces. This system proved itself during the War of 1812 and subsequent campaigns against Napoleon, and survived until the fall of the House of Romanov.

At the end of the Napoleonic Wars the Russian economy was in ruins. Consequently, Alexander had to cut the Navy budget to the point where the Baltic fleet could not afford continuous exercises in open seas. Traversay had to limit fleet exercises to the shallow and narrow eastern extremity of the Gulf of Finland, sarcastically often called the Marquis Puddle. By 1817, the Navy budget had recovered and the Admiralty Shipyard managed to complete seven new frigates and two ships of the line. The Navy also resumed long-range operations, still, the sobriquet Marquis Puddle persisted for nearly two centuries.

In 1815-1821 Traversay sponsored long-range expeditions into the Arctic and Antarctic waters. The first (1815–1818), led by Otto von Kotzebue, explored Pacific Ocean from Kamchatka to Sandwich Islands. The second (1819–1821), led by Lazarev and Bellingshausen, circumnavigated the Antarctic coast, discovering and naming the Traversay Islands on the way. The third, also launched in 1819, led by Anjou, Shishmaryov, and Wrangel, traversed the Bering Strait and explored the Arctic coastline of Alaska and Russia, reaching 76° 15′N. Traversay was offered a share in the Russian-American Company, which benefited from these expeditions, but refused, citing conflict of interest. He also declined the title of prince (knyaz) of the Russian Empire, believing that the rare title of marquis will be better for his offspring.

In 1821, after the death of his second wife, the aging Traversay tried to resign for the first time. Tsar Alexander did not let him go; instead, he honored Traversay with the Order of St. Andrew. Alexander also allowed Traversay to move from the city to his country home in Romanshchina (near Luga, 120 kilometers from Saint Petersburg), and to run the Navy operations from there. For the next 7 years, the Navy Ministry operated far away from any naval base. The tsar himself regularly visited Traversay in his country office, with the last meeting in Romanshchina occurring in September 1825, four weeks before Alexander's death at Taganrog.

At about the same time Traversay suffered his first ischemia seizures. During the first three years of the reign of Nicholas I, Traversay continued rebuilding the Baltic fleet after the disastrous flood of 1824, gradually passing his duties to younger officers. In 1828 Traversay finally retired, with an honorary award of Order of St. George, 4th class. He died in Romanschina in 1831.

=== Private life ===
Traversay married his first wife, Marie Madeleine, daughter of admiral Jean-Joseph de Riouffe, in Rochefort in 1783. Two of their children born in France and Switzerland, Claire (1785–1842) and Jean-Francois (future Alexander Ivanovich de Traversay, Sr.), lived long enough to acquire Russian citizenship. Marie Madeleine died while giving birth in 1796 but the newborn boy, Alexander, survived. Alexander's godmother in his orthodox baptism, the empress Catherine, generously awarded the baby with a naval officer's commission. Traversay, however, feared that the newborn would perish, too, and asked the empress to transfer her gift to Jean-Francois, who was renamed Alexander to retain the commission. Baby Alexander survived as well, so the family had two Alexanders: Alexander Sr. (1791–1850) and Alexander Jr. (1796–1866). Both eventually joined the Russian Navy.

Four years later, Traversay married Louise Ulrica de Bruine (Loviisa Ulriikka Bruun), herself 27 years younger than her new husband. She was the daughter of Elisabeth Fabritius and her husband burgher Kaarle Bruun, a rich merchant and businessman in Hamina, Old Finland, the nearest chartered town to Traversay's command, the fortification on the Kymi River. Elisabeth and Kaarle Bruun owned Oravala manor of Valkeala. This marriage produced two children - Fyodor = Frederic (b. 1803, a civil servant in the Navy), and Marie (1807–1871). Louise Ulrica died in 1821. Later, Louise Ulrica's nephew Theodor Bruun became the Minister State Secretary of Finland and was created a baron.

Traversay accepted Russian citizenship in 1811, when he registered as a resident landlord of Voronezh governorate. He, however, remained a Roman Catholic and spoke Russian poorly until his death. His children were baptised and raised in the Orthodox faith, and fully assimilated into Russian society of their period. Traversay's descendants live in France, Kiev, and Orsha (Belarus).

== Sources ==
Printed:

- (in French) Madeleine Du Chatenet. L'amiral Jean-Baptiste de Traversay, un Français, Ministre de la marine des tsars. Tallandier, 1 novembre 1996. ISBN 978-2-235-02159-3
- (in Russian) Мадлен дю Шатне. Жан Батист де Траверсе министр флота Российского. - М., Наука, 2003. ISBN 5-02-008874-9
- Roche, Jean-Michel (2005). Dictionnaire des bâtiments de la flotte de guerre française de Colbert à nos jours. Vol. 1. Group Retozel-Maury Millau. ISBN 978-2-9525917-0-6. OCLC 165892922. (1671-1870)

Online:

- (in Russian) Олег Траверсе, Мадлен дю Шатне. Адмирал де Траверсе - главный командир Черноморского флота // Зеркало недели, No. 25 (500) 26 июня — 2 июля 2004.
- (in English) Blazon and bookplate of Marquis de Traversay
- (in French) Genealogy of Prevost de Sansac family
