= Visokoi Island =

Uninhabited island in the South Sandwich Islands

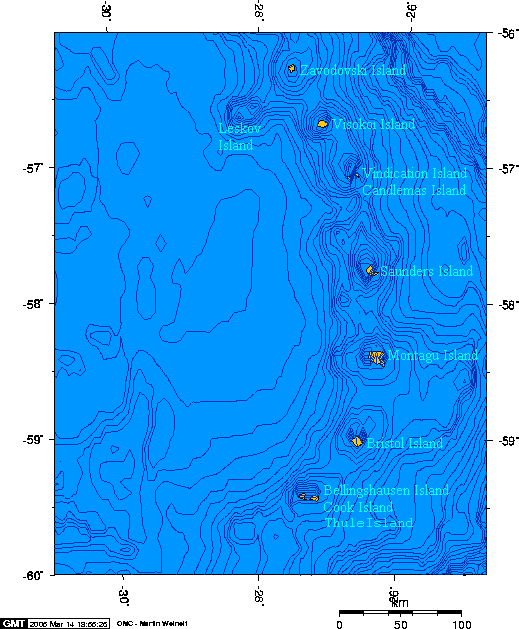
- South Sandwich Islands

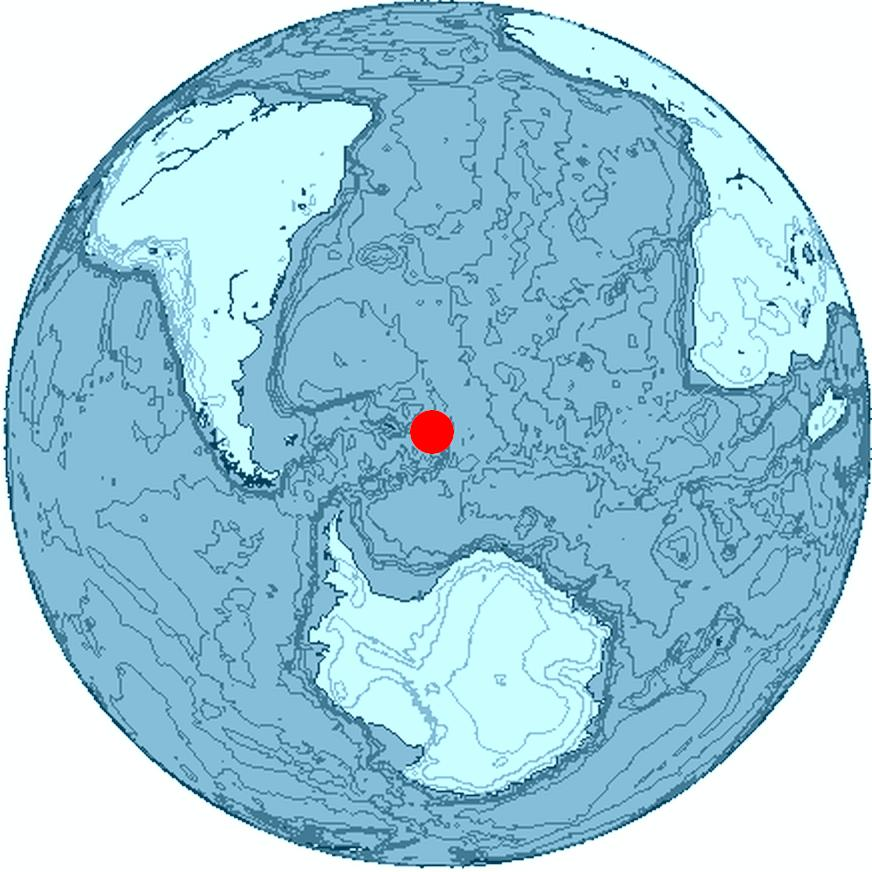
- Location of Visokoi Island

Geography
- Coordinates: 56°42′S 27°09′W
- Archipelago: South Sandwich Islands
- Length: 8 km (5 mi)
- Width: 6 km (3.7 mi)
- Highest elevation: 1,005 m (3297 ft)
- Highest point: Mount Hodson

Administration
- United Kingdom

Demographics
- Population: Uninhabited

Visokoi Island is an uninhabited volcanic island and one the three Traversay Islands that constitute a subgroup of the South Sandwich Islands, in the Southern Ocean.

Visokoi consists of one major volcano, Mount Hodson, whose height is usually given as 1,005 metres (3,297 ft). The mountain is mostly covered by glaciers, except for several low areas on the coast like the northern Finger Point and eastern Irving Point. Several parasitic vents are found especially on the eastern side, and one vent close to Finger Point is still hot. Eruptions were reported in 1830, 1927 and 1930, and a large landslide took place during historical time.

== Geography and geomorphology ==
Visokoi is one of the South Sandwich Islands, which lie southeast of South Georgia in the Southern Ocean and extend over a distance of 350 kilometres (220 mi) in north-south direction. Leskov Island is 58 kilometres (36 mi) west and Zavodovski Island 45 kilometres (28 mi) north from Visokoi; together they makes up the Traversay Islands subgroup of the South Sandwich Islands. Icebergs occur in the surrounding waters.

The island has an oval shape with a length of 8 kilometres (5.0 mi) and a width of 6 kilometres (3.7 mi); the surface area is about 30.7 square kilometres (11.9 sq mi). The pointy end is east and ends at Irving Point, and the blunt end west with the western Sulphur Point and southwestern Wordie Point. The northernmost point is Finger Point and the southernmost Mikhaylov Point. Cliffs and ice falls make up most of the coastline, except at Irving Point where there are an offshore reef and sandy beaches and Finger Point which is a low-lying lava flow. The island is asymmetric, with the western side having higher cliffs and steeper slopes than the eastern side. Most of the inside of the island is covered with heavily crevassed ice, which reaches thicknesses of 80 metres (260 ft) and extends to the coast. The total surface area covered by ice in 1962 amounted to 24.1 square kilometres (9.3 sq mi). The 1,209 metres (3,967 ft) high Mount Hodson rises on the western side of the island and has a flat summit. It features a 900 metres (3,000 ft) wide summit crater surrounded by two concentric sector collapse scars. Several scoria cones rise from the eastern part, including Shamrock Hill and an unnamed but probably young cone which form a nunatak. They rise slightly above the ice level and bear no evidence of craters. Visokoi Island appears to consist of a basal lava plateau, which crops out close to the coastline, and a volcanic cone that rises above the plateau. Two nested calderas cut across both formations and are surrounded by cliffs more than 100 metres (330 ft) high.

Finger Point appears to consist of a lava flow with preserved surface features that extends northwards from the scree-covered slopes of Visokoi, forming a low-lying coastal platform. Several islets lie around Visokoi, such as Coffin Rock off the northeastern coast. The island is surrounded by a 2.3–6 kilometres (1.4–3.7 mi) wide shelf at less than 200 metres (660 ft) depth. The shelf broadens with depth to form a large submarine volcano, which reaches a width of 57 kilometres (35 mi) at 2,500 metres (8,200 ft) depth. The total volume of Visokoi complete with the submarine parts is about 3,000 cubic kilometres (720 cu mi) and consists mostly of pillow lavas. The submarine edifice has an east-west extension, with numerous small volcanoes, chutes and traces (hummocky terrain) of a sector collapse on the western side and a more extensive shelf cut by submarine canyons on the eastern side. From there, a submarine ridge connects Visokoi with Candlemas Island farther south.

== Geology ==
East of the South Sandwich Islands, the South America Plate subducts beneath the Scotia Plate at a rate of 70–85 millimetres per year (2.8–3.3 in/year). The subduction is responsible for the existence of the South Sandwich island arc, which is constituted by about eleven islands in an eastward curving chain, submarine volcanoes such as Protector in the north and Adventure and Kemp in the south, and numerous secondary volcanoes. From north to south Zavodovski, Leskov Island, Visokoi Island, Candlemas Island-Vindication Island, Saunders Island, Montagu Island, Bristol Island-Freezland Rock, Bellingshausen Island, Cook Island-Thule Island emerge from the sea. Most of the islands are stratovolcanoes of various sizes.

=== Composition ===
Volcanic rocks are mostly basaltic, but basaltic andesite and andesite are also found. Phenocrysts include clinopyroxene, hypersthene, magnetite, olivine and plagioclase. The rocks are notably iron-rich and define calc-alkaline or tholeiitic suites.

== Geologic history ==
The island grew during the past one million years by an alternation of pyroclastic rocks and lava flows with columnar jointing, cut by dykes, building one volcano. Later the eastern cinder cones formed, and the western side of the island was subject to coastal erosion. At some point, Plinian or sub-Plinian eruptions took place. Potassium-argon dating has yielded an age of 300,000 ± 100,000 years for a rock at Sulphur Point, but activity continued into the Holocene and the Finger Point lava flow may be recent. Tephra layers in marine sediment cores aged 300,000, 267,000 and 217,000 years, and an 18,000 years old tephra layer in the Vostok ice core has been attributed to Visokoi.

The occurrence of historical eruptions is uncertain, but differences between the appearance of the island reported in 1819 and 1830 imply that one caldera formed between 1819 and 1830, probably in 1829, while a sector collapse took place between 1927 and 1930. Eruptions were recorded in 1830, 1927 and 1930 when passing ships observed smoke columns, and may reflect the aftermath of eruptions from the central crater. There are no tephra layers embedded in ice but scoria lying on ice may represent either recent activity or older eruptions whose products were covered by ice and then re-exposed.

=== Steaming and fumarole ===
Mount Hodson frequently emits plumes. An active fumarole associated with the scoria cone at Finger Point was observed in 1930. In 1962 this fumarole was gone, but volcanically heated ground was reported from the same site in 1964. Thermal anomalies are not visible from satellite images. The fumarole was surrounded by a concentric area of algae, lichens and mosses.

== Flora and fauna ==
Away from the fumarole, vegetation is largely absent from Visokoi and consists mostly of lichens growing on bare rocks. Non-vertebrates include mites and springtails while amphipods, brittle stars, bryozoans, sponges and hydrozoans have been recovered from the shallow water surrounding Visokoi.

Antarctic fulmars, cape petrels, chinstrap penguins, gentoo penguins, kelp gulls, macaroni penguins and skuas nest in the cliffs which are ice-free, and on the low coastal platforms especially at Finger Point. More than 100,000 chinstrap penguin breeding pairs occur on Visokoi. Additional seabirds and seals visit the island without clear evidence of reproduction. Almost a thousand Antarctic fur seals were seen at Irving Point in 1964, making it the largest occurrence in the South Sandwich Islands.

== Human history ==
Visokoi and the northern South Sandwich Islands were discovered on the 23 December 1819 by the Thaddeus von Bellingshausen expedition. The proper spelling of the island name is Vysokij. The island can be accessed from Wordie Point and Finger Point, where there are low-lying platforms, but is difficult.
