= Kemp Caldera =

Submarine volcanoes located south of the South Sandwich Islands

- Summit depth: 80

Location
- Coordinates: 59°42′S 28°15′W

History
- Discovery date: 2009
- First visit: 2009

Kemp Caldera (Note: Also known as McIntosh Caldera) and Kemp Seamount form a submarine volcano south of the South Sandwich Islands, in a region where several seamounts are located. The seamount rises to a depth of 80 metres (260 ft) below sea level; the caldera has a diameter of 8.3 by 6.5 kilometres (5.2 mi × 4.0 mi) and reaches a depth of 1,600 metres (5,200 ft). The caldera contains several Hydrothermal vents, including white smokers (a type of vent that emits cold, alkaline fluids) and diffuse venting areas, which are host to chemolithotrophic ecological communities. The seamount and caldera, which were discovered by seafloor mapping in 2009, are part of the South Georgia and the South Sandwich Islands Marine Protected Area.

== Geography and geomorphology ==
Kemp Caldera lies at the southern end of the South Sandwich Islands, between the Scotia Sea to the north and the Weddell Sea to the south, about 50 kilometres (31 mi) west-southwest of Thule Island. The caldera was discovered and sampled in 2009 during bathymetric mapping operations carried out by the RRS James Clark Ross. Further sampling efforts took place in 2010 and 2011. Another caldera, Adventure Caldera, lies east of Kemp Seamount; together with several other seamounts the calderas form the Vysokaya Bank. The Nelson Seamounts lie farther south.

The volcano consists of two submarine edifices: the Kemp Caldera proper to the west and Kemp Seamount to the east. The latter rises to a depth of 80 metres (260 ft) below sea level. The caldera is elongated in an east–west direction and has dimensions of 8.6 by 6.5 kilometres (5.3 mi × 4.0 mi). The caldera has a volume of about 9–12 cubic kilometres (2.2–2.9 cu mi) and may have been excavated during the course of multiple eruptions. The caldera floor lies at a depth of 1,600 metres (5,200 ft), 700 metres (2,300 ft) below the margin of the caldera, which has a sill at 900 metres (3,000 ft) depth, and contains a resurgent cone 1 kilometre (0.62 mi) wide and 250 metres (820 ft) high. Numerous volcanic cones and volcanic craters dot its rims, presumably from post-caldera volcanism. Deposits left by mass failures such as slide blocks and debris flow chutes occur both in and outside of the caldera. Basaltic rocks, sediments, sulfur and volcanic ash cover the surrounding seafloor.

== Geology ==
Volcanoes in Antarctica and the Southern Ocean are found both on the mainland (Antarctic Peninsula, Marie Byrd Land, Victoria Land) and outlying islands (e.g. South Sandwich Islands, South Shetland Islands) and feature both active eruptions and fumarole systems. Hydrothermal vents in the Southern Ocean occur at the Australian-Antarctic Ridge and the East Scotia Ridge.

Subduction of the South American Plate beneath the Sandwich Plate occurs at a rate of 7–7.9 centimetres per year (2.8–3.1 in/year) and is responsible for volcanic activity in the South Sandwich Arc. As the slab descends into the mantle, water is released and induces melting in the mantle wedge above the slab. The arc includes the eleven volcanic South Sandwich Islands and other submarine volcanoes, such as Protector Shoal. Other hydrothermal vents in the arc are found at Quest Caldera and Adventure Crater. Unlike Adventure Crater, Kemp Caldera is located within the backarc region.

=== Geochemistry and activity ===
Kemp Caldera has erupted low-potassium tholeiite and basaltic andesite, and the geochemistry of volcanic rocks at Kemp Seamount is consistent with volcanic arc magma. Kemp Seamount has not had its summit torn down by icebergs through seabed gouging, implying that it is relatively young. The fresh appearance of the submarine volcanic features at Kemp Caldera, including the lack of sediments filling the caldera, indicate that it was recently active.

Hydrothermal vents occur at the foot and on the flanks of the resurgent cone and include white smokers. Three vent zones have been named: "Great Wall" and "Toxic Castle" around the resurgent cone, "Beehive Chimney" on the inner slopes of the caldera and "Devil's Horn" at the north-northwestern caldera rim. Hydrothermal vents form both diffuse venting areas and discrete chimneys, and have deposited anhydrite, baryte, copper sulfides and elemental sulfur. Liquid sulfur has been observed and forms sulfur droplets. Temperatures of 103–202 °C (217–396 °F) have been measured at the white smokers. Water temperatures at Kemp Caldera reach 1 °C (34 °F) while sediments are warmed by volcanic activity to 5 °C (41 °F).

== Ecology ==
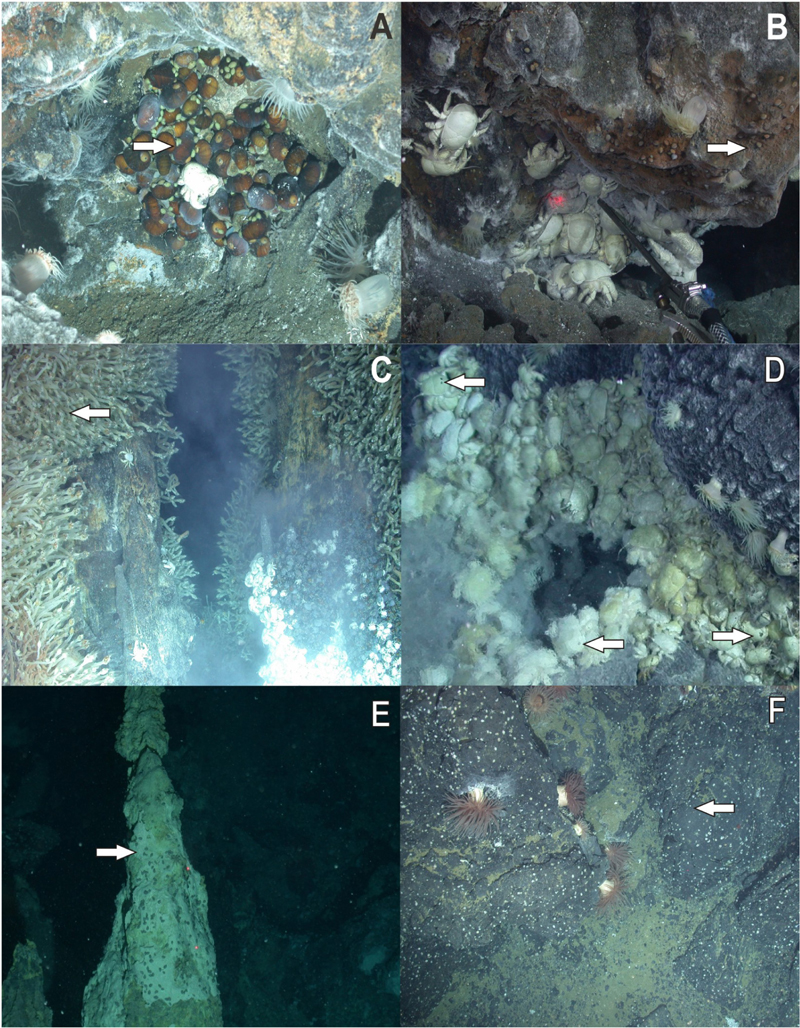
Images of a limpet found at Kemp Caldera

Bacterial mats, clams and limpets settle on the hydrothermal vents, which sustain chemosynthetic communities. Sponges grow on the periphery of the vent areas. "Dead zones" - accumulations of animal carcasses, which have also been found at other submarine hydrothermal systems on Earth - are found in the area. Most of the bacteria found at the caldera belong to the class gammaproteobacteria.

Numerous marine animals have been identified at vent sites, such as actinostolid sea anemones, the barnacle Neolepas scotiaensis, vesicomyid clams such as Archivesica puertodeseadoi, Lepetodrilus concentricus clams, cocculinid limpets, pycnogonids of the genus Sericosura and the starfish Paulasterias tyleri. The vesicomyid clam communities are made up of unique species, not found in the nearby East Scotia ridge vent systems. Away from hydrothermal vents alcyonaceans, brisingids, cnidarians, holothuroids, ophiuroids, (Note: Such as Amphioplus sp., Ophiura antarctica and Ophiura irrorata) polychaetes (Note: Including siboglinids such as the "bone-eating worms" Osedax) and shrimp (Note: Such as Eualus amandae which was first discovered at Kemp Caldera and the East Scotia Ridge) live on and in the seafloor. The bivalve species Spinaxinus caldarium and Parathyasira dearborni were first identified at Kemp Caldera, as were two "bone-eating worm" species, Osedax crouchi and Osedax rogersi.

Whale falls have been found in the surrounding area and support their own biological communities; in total about nine unique ecological communities have been identified in and around Kemp Caldera. The occurrence of limpets at both hydrothermal vents and whale falls in the Kemp Caldera area has been used as evidence that whale falls may be a stepping stone for species to propagate to submarine hydrothermal vents.

=== Conservation ===
Kemp Caldera lies within the South Georgia and the South Sandwich Islands Marine Protected Area. Longline fishing is restricted and bottom trawling is outright prohibited. As of 2019 further legislation protecting the environment from mining and hydrocarbon exploration was being developed.
