= Mount Asphyxia =

Volcano on Zavodovski Island in the British South Sandwich Islands

- Mount Curry
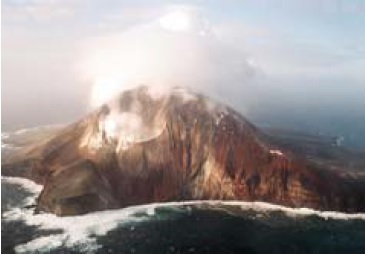

Highest point
- Elevation: 551 m (1,808 ft)
- Coordinates: 56°18′S 27°34′W

Geography
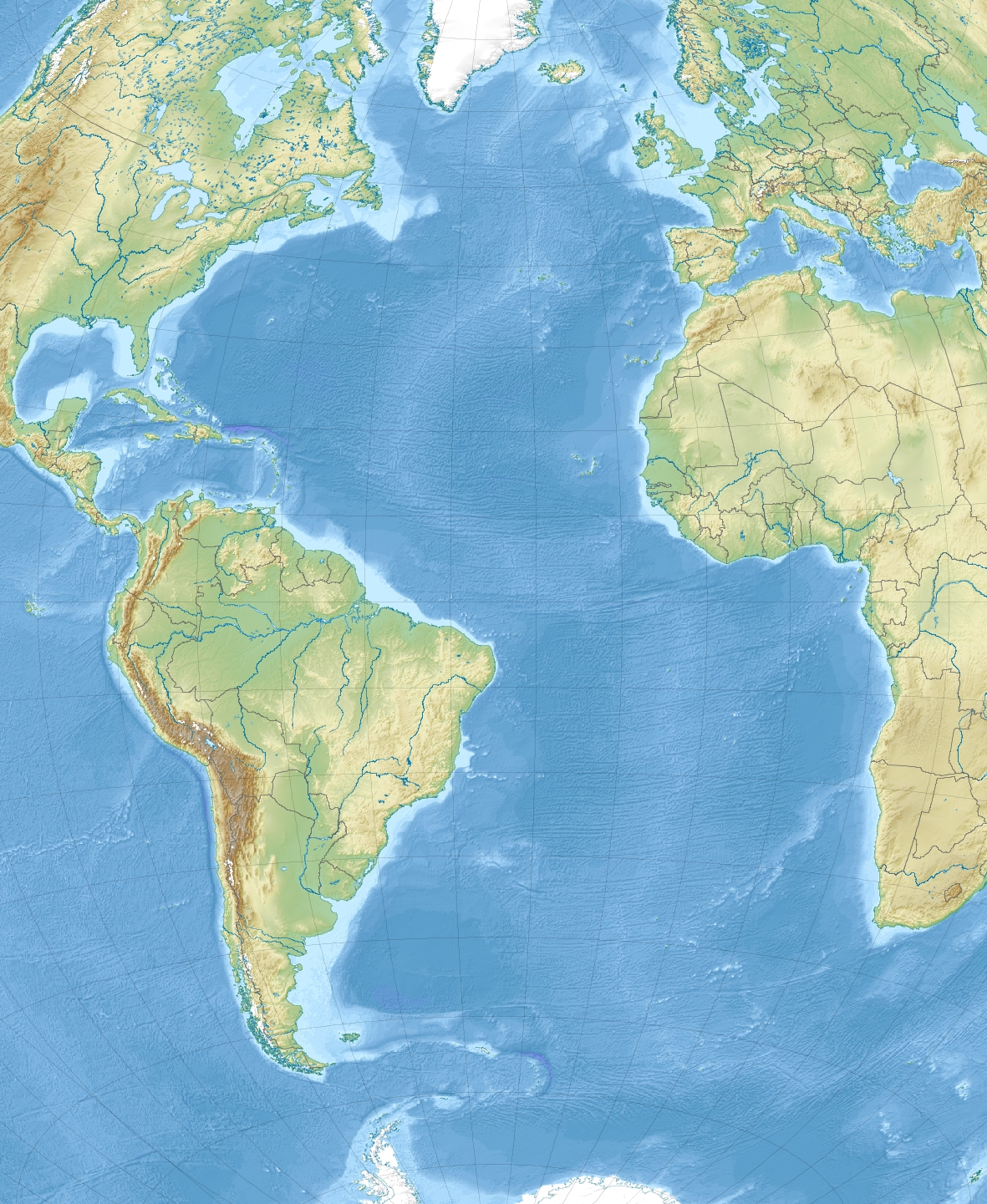
- Location within Atlantic Ocean
- Location: Zavodovski Island, South Sandwich Islands, United Kingdom

Geology
- Mountain type: Stratovolcano
- Last eruption: 2016

Mount Asphyxia, also known as Mount Curry, is a prominent volcanic cone reaching to 550 metres (1,800 ft), forming the summit of Zavodovski Island, northernmost of the South Sandwich Islands.

== Description ==
One of the names of the volcano refers to the suffocating fumes experienced on the island; volcanic fumes spew from the mountain and to this is added the stench of penguin guano. The fumes can indeed suffocate a visitor to the island. These qualities have given names to a number of Zavodovski Island's other features.

The volcano erupted in March 2016; by July, between one third and one half of the island was covered in ash, putting the penguin colonies at risk.

== See also ==
- List of volcanoes in South Sandwich Islands
