= Montagu Island =

Largest of the South Sandwich Islands

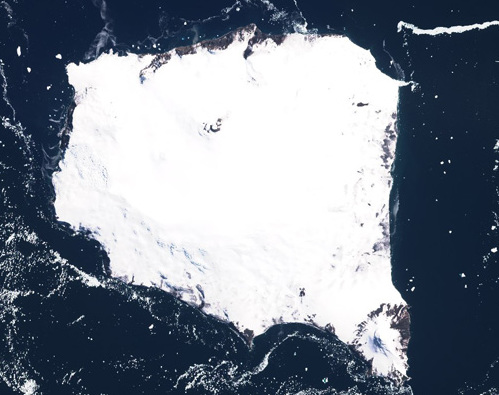
- Satellite image of Montagu, taken on 2 December 2019

- Location of Montagu Island in the South Sandwich Islands

Geography
- Coordinates: 58.45°S 26.36°W
- Archipelago: South Sandwich Islands
- Length: 12 km (7.5 mi)
- Width: 10 km (6 mi)
- Highest elevation: 1,370 m (4490 ft)
- Highest point: Mount Belinda

Administration
- United Kingdom
- Overseas Territory: South Georgia and the South Sandwich Islands

Demographics
- Population: Uninhabited

Montagu Island is the largest of the South Sandwich Islands, located in the Scotia Sea off the coast of Antarctica. Almost entirely ice-covered with only sparse rocky outcrops, Montagu consists of a large caldera with a large parasitic cone, Mount Oceanite. Several secondary volcanic cones have formed in the caldera, including Mount Belinda.

The island is rarely visited owing to the remote location, and there is only sparse vegetation. Penguins and seabirds live along the coasts. Before an eruption in 2001, which continued for several years and formed a lava delta on the northern coast, Mount Belinda was not known to have been active during the Holocene (the past 12,000 years).

== Geography and geomorphology ==
Montagu Island is part of the South Sandwich Islands, a north–south trending chain of islands north of Antarctica and east of the Scotia Sea 2,000 kilometres (1,200 mi) southeast of the Falklands. From north to south they include Zavodovski Island, Leskov Island, Visokoi Island, Candlemas Island-Vindication Island, Saunders Island, Montagu Island, Bristol Island, Bellingshausen Island and Cook Island-Thule Island. Politically, South Georgia and the South Sandwich Islands make up the UK Overseas Territory of South Georgia and the South Sandwich Islands. In 2012, a marine protected area was established in the South Sandwich Islands. The scope of the protected area was further expanded in 2019. Owing to its remoteness, Montagu Island as of 2005 had only been visited four times: In 1930, 1957, 1964 and 1997. It was discovered in 1775 by James Cook and initially named "Cape Montagu" as he thought it was a promontory of a larger landmass; Thaddeus von Bellingshausen in 1815 determined that it was actually an island. Other names are Isla Jorge and Montague Island.

With dimensions of 10 by 12 kilometres (6.2 mi × 7.5 mi), Montagu is the largest of the South Sandwich Islands. It consists of an eroded mostly ice-covered shield volcano. The island has a roughly rectangular outline, with a promontory on the southeastern corner. There rises the 900 metres (3,000 ft) high steep-sided Mount Oceanite with a 270 metres (890 ft) wide and 100 metres (330 ft) deep summit crater, and a landslide scar to the east. Capes on the island include the northern Poncet Point which formed during the 2001–2007 eruption, northeastern Leeson Point, eastern Mathias Point just east of Mount Oceanite, Allen Point southeast of Mount Oceanite, southern Scarlett Point, southwestern Horsburgh Point and Hollow Point and northwestern Borley Point. Several small islets lie around the island, including Longlow Rock just off the western coast. Rocky outcrops are limited to coastal cliffs, which alternate with ice falls.

A 6 kilometres (3.7 mi) wide ice-filled caldera lies on Montagu; it is the largest known caldera of the South Sandwich Islands and formed from explosive eruptions. The caldera rim is breached to the northwest, where a tidewater glacier exits the caldera to reach the sea. Several secondary cones have formed inside and around the caldera, including Mount Belinda which is 1,125 metres (3,691 ft) or 1,295 metres (4,249 ft) high. The name has also been applied to the a peak on the southern caldera rim, which is the high point of Montagu Island at 1,370 metres (4,490 ft). Some parasitic cones rise above the cliffs.

The submarine structure of Montagu Island is characterized by a largely regular, oval edifice with the pointy end to the west. A shallow shelf, which probably formed through erosion during glacial sea level lowstands, surrounds the island with widths of 14 kilometres (8.7 mi) to the west. There lies the 6 by 4.8 kilometres (3.7 mi × 3.0 mi) Longlow Bank at less than 600 metres (2,000 ft) depth. At 2,000 metres (6,600 ft) depth Montagu Island is about 62 kilometres (39 mi) deep. Several ridges and landslide scars extend and cut into the edifice. A smaller submarine volcanic edifice merges into the western end of the Montagu Island volcano. About 70 kilometres (43 mi) east-southeast of Montagu lies Montagu Bank, a seamount in the forearc with a steep eastern slope. It is much older than the main volcanic arc; potassium-argon dating has yielded ages of 32–28 million years.

== Geology ==
During the past five million years, westward subduction of the South America Plate beneath the Sandwich Plate has given rise to the island arc volcanism of the South Sandwich Islands. The islands are mostly stratovolcanoes consisting of basalt and basaltic andesite, and most islands feature active fumaroles, reports of steam emission or outright eruptions. Additional volcanoes are submarine volcanoes, like Protector Shoal, which in 1962 produced a pumice raft that reached New Zealand.

The few outcrops indicate that Montagu Island is formed by alternating layers of lava flows, scoria, tuffs and volcanic ash. Rocks are mostly basalt and basaltic andesite, defining a potassium-poor tholeiitic suite, and have a relatively uniform composition. Clinopyroxene and olivine-containing lavas close to Allen Point are defined as oceanites; Mount Oceanite is named after these rocks. Diopside occurs also inclusions in other volcanic rocks. Sediments subducted into the trench may play a role in the formation of Montagu magmas.

== Ecology ==
Penguin colonies occur at the capes and consist mostly of chinstrap penguins, but Adelie penguins are also found. According to a 2016 publication, there were more than 2,000 chinstrap penguin pairs and more than 1,800 Adelie penguin pairs on Montagu Island. Other seabirds breeding at Montagu include Antarctic fulmars, Antarctic skuas, black-bellied storm petrels, blue-eyed shags, cape petrels and snow petrels. Montagu Island largely lacks vegetation, although mosses (mostly Drepanocladus uncinatus) grow in drainages and algae in penguin colonies. Mites and springtails have been collected.

== Eruptive history ==
A rock from Horsburgh Point yielded an age of 1,000,000 ± 300,000 years by potassium-argon dating. Before 1990, there was no indication of any historical or Holocene activity at Montagu. Other seabirds and seals occasionally come ashore on the island. This probably reflects its remote location and extensive ice cover. Landing parties likewise did not document any heated ground or fumarole activity. Eruptions of low intensity may have taken place between 1995 and 1997.

Pyroclastic cone formed by the 2001–2007 eruption, with melt pits, tephra-covered ice and a moat formed by ice melting

Satellite images observed an eruption at Mount Belinda, commencing in September or October 2001 and ending in 2007, although heat anomalies from the cooling of the flow continued into 2010. The eruption was intermittently observed by satellites and passing ships during the following two years. Initially it consisted of the emission of tephra, volcanic plumes and a 600 metres (2,000 ft) long lava flow. A lava lake might have formed during the course of the eruption. In August 2003, a larger lava flow was observed, which extended down the northern flank of Mount Belinda over a length of 2 kilometres (1.2 mi), cutting down into the ice. The eruption peaked in 2005, when ash emissions built a 500 metres (1,600 ft) wide cinder cone on Mount Belinda, with a 150 metres (490 ft) wide crater. A lava flow reached the sea on the northern coast, forming a 800 by 500 metres (2,600 ft × 1,600 ft) wide lava delta later named Poncet Point. Steam columns rose from the site where lava entered the seawater, and a lagoon filled with hot water. Additional lava flows were emitted on the summit, which developed a number of glacial-volcanic landforms such as melt pits formed by lava bombs. The eruption led to the pronounced melting and disruption of the ice cap, with one glacier advancing into the sea.

This eruption was discovered and followed almost exclusively through satellite imaging, which also recorded sulfur dioxide emissions at a rate of 180 tons per day while the eruption was ongoing.

== Placenames ==
The island was named by Cook after John Montagu, 4th Earl of Sandwich, at the time First Lord of the Admiralty. Most placenames including Mount Belinda were assigned during the Discovery Investigations, often after participants to the expeditions or their relatives. Hollow Point is a translation of Spanish Hueca Point, a name used on Argentine maps in 1953. Mathias Point was named after the helicopter pilot during the HMS Protector expedition in 1964, Leeson Point after the lieutenant/pilot on the same ship, and Poncet Point after a yachter who was the first person to land on this new land.
