= Mount Belinda =

Volcano in the South Sandwich Islands

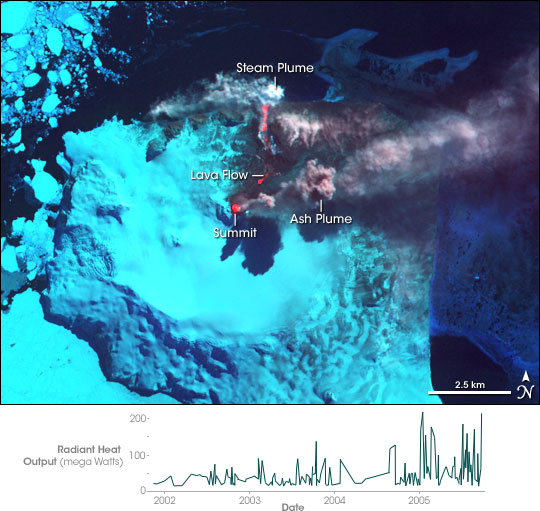
- False-color image of the ongoing eruption of Mount Belinda (September 23, 2005). The graph indicates the amount of radiant heat (in megawatts).

Highest point
- Elevation: 1,370 m (4,490 ft)
- Prominence: 1,370 m (4,490 ft)
- Listing: Ribu
- Coordinates: 58°26′S 26°20′W

Geography
- Location: Montagu Island, South Sandwich Islands

Geology
- Mountain type: Stratovolcano
- Last eruption: 2001 - 2007

Mount Belinda is a stratovolcano on Montagu Island, in the South Sandwich Islands of the Scotia Sea. At 1,370 m (4,490 ft), Mount Belinda is the highest peak in the South Sandwich Islands, a part of South Georgia and the South Sandwich Islands.

Belinda was inactive until late 2001, when it erupted, the eruption lasting until 2007. The eruption produced large quantities of basaltic lava, melting the thick cover of ice that had accumulated while the volcano lay dormant, and "producing a marvelous 'natural laboratory' for studying lava-ice interactions relevant to the biology of extreme environments, as well as to processes believed to be important on Mars."

The activity throughout 2005 marked the highest levels yet. The increase in activity in the fall of 2005 produced an active 3.5-kilometre-long (2.2-mile) lava flow, extending from the summit cone of Mount Belinda to the sea. The flow spread northeast from the volcanic vent, and then became diverted due north by an arête. By late 2007, eruptive activity had ceased, and in 2010 the only activity was from scattered fumaroles and cooling lava.
