= HMS Protector (A146) =

Royal Navy patrol boat

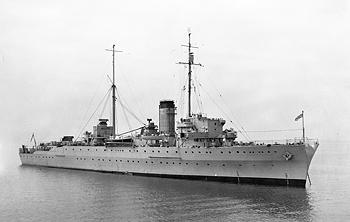
- HMS Protector in 1952, prior to be being refitted for Antarctic service

History

United Kingdom
- Name: HMS Protector
- Builder: Yarrow Shipbuilders, Glasgow
- Laid down: August 1935
- Launched: 20 August 1936
- Commissioned: 30 December 1936
- Reclassified: Antarctic patrol ship in 1955
- Fate: Sold 10 February 1970 for breaking up

General characteristics
- Displacement: 2,900 long tons as net layer; 3,450 tons as ice patrol ship
- Length: 346 ft (105 m)
- Beam: 50 ft (15 m)
- Draught: 16 ft (4.9 m)
- Propulsion: Four Admiralty 3-drum boilers; Two British Thomson-Houston geared turbines
- Speed: 19 knots
- Complement: 21 officers; 238 ratings
- Armament: Twin 4-inch gun mounting; Twin Oerlikon mountings; Four Hotchkiss 3-pdr saluting gun
- Aircraft carried: Two Westland Whirlwind helicopters

HMS Protector was an Antarctic patrol vessel of the Royal Navy between 1955 and 1968. She was built in 1935 as a net laying ship.

== Construction and design ==
Protector was laid down as a fast net layer by Yarrow Shipbuilders at their Scotstoun, Glasgow shipyard on 15 August 1935, launched on 20 August 1936 and was completed in December 1936. She was commissioned on 30 December 1936. Her design was based on that of HMS Guardian, built in 1932, but with more powerful machinery and improved equipment for handling nets.

Protector was 338 feet (103 m) long overall and 310 feet (94 m) between perpendiculars, with a beam of 53 feet (16 m) and a draught of 13 feet 9 inches (4.19 m) at deep load. Displacement was 2,820 long tons (2,870 t) standard and 3,610 long tons (3,670 t) deep load. Two Admiralty three-drum boilers fed steam to Parsons geared steam turbines, which drove two propeller shafts. The ship's machinery was rated at 9,000 shaft horsepower (6,700 kW), giving a speed of 20 knots (23 mph; 37 km/h). The turbines were replaced in 1945 by British Thompson-Houston geared turbines.

The ship was initially armed with a single QF 4-inch (102 mm) naval gun Mk V gun on a low-angle mounting aft, with this was later replaced by a twin QF 4-inch naval gun Mk XVI anti-aircraft mount, while seven 20 mm Oerlikon cannon were added to provide a close-in anti aircraft defence. The ship had a crew of 190.

=== Modifications ===
Protector was modified in 1955 for service as a guardship for the Falkland Islands Dependencies and a survey vessel for Antarctic waters. The twin 4-inch gun mount was moved to a forward position, allowing a flight deck and hangar for a helicopter to be fitted aft, while the close-in armament was reduced to four 20 mm cannon (with four 3-pounder saluting guns also carried). The ship's bridge was enclosed and the hull ice strengthened. A further refit in 1957 saw Protector's bridge remodelled, while in 1958 a tripod mainmast was mounted on the ship's hangar, and a crane was fitted.

== Service ==
Protector was listed as part of the Mediterranean Fleet in February 1939, and remained part of the Mediterranean Fleet in August, on the eve of the outbreak of the Second World War.

Protector served in the South Atlantic and in the Norwegian Campaign during World War II before being hit by an aerial torpedo in the Mediterranean. She was towed to Bombay and repaired before returning to Britain after the end of hostilities.

In 1953, the ship took part in the Fleet Review to celebrate the Coronation of Queen Elizabeth II.

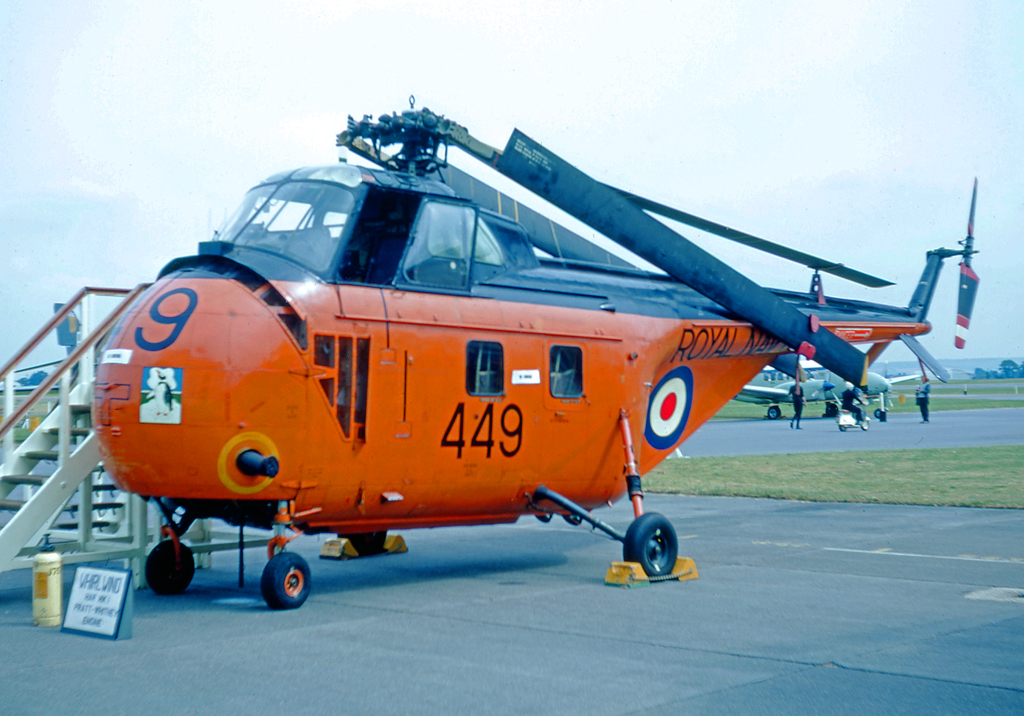
Royal Navy Westland Whirlwind wearing Penguin symbol after service aboard HMS Protector in the late 1960s.

After time in the fleet reserve as a training ship, Protector was refitted as an ice patrol ship in Devonport, with a rudimentary hangar and flight deck for two Westland Whirlwind helicopters. She made her first Antarctic patrol in the winter of 1955/56, serving the Falkland Islands and the British Antarctic Survey bases. She returned to the Antarctic 13 more times in her career. During her patrols the ship rescued the passengers and crew of the icebound MV Theron, including Sir Edmund Hillary and Dr Vivian Fuchs. In 1957, Protector rescued the passengers of the RRS Shackleton, which had struck an iceberg and had to perform emergency repairs to keep from sinking.

In 1960 Protector was under the command of the Commander in Chief, South Atlantic and South America.

On 6 December 1963 Leading Seaman Reg Hodge and Able Seaman Michael 'Shady' Lane lost their lives whilst prepping a depth charge for seismic research aboard HMS Protector . She was working with RRS John Biscoe South of Drake's Passage at the time. The explosion injured a number of other sailors. They were buried with full naval honours in the cemetery at Stanley.

Protector was sold for scrap at Inverkeithing on 10 February 1970. She was replaced by HMS Endurance.

== Publications ==
- Blackman, Raymond V. B., ed. (1953). Jane's Fighting Ships 1953–54. New York: McGraw-Hill Book Company.
- Blackman, Raymond V. B., ed. (1960). Jane's Fighting Ships 1960–61. London: Sampson Low, Marston & Co., Ltd.
- Colledge, J. J.; Warlow, Ben (2006) [1969]. Ships of the Royal Navy: The Complete Record of All Fighting Ships of the Royal Navy from the 15th Century to the Present (3rd Rev ed.). London: Chatham Publishing. ISBN 978-1-86176-281-8. OCLC 67375475.
- Gardiner, Robert; Chesneau, Roger, eds. (1980). Conway's All The World's Fighting Ships 1922–1946. London: Conway Maritime Press. ISBN 0-85177-146-7.
