= Fabian Gottlieb von Bellingshausen =

Russian Navy officer, cartographer, and explorer (1778–1852)

Fabian Gottlieb Benjamin von Bellingshausen
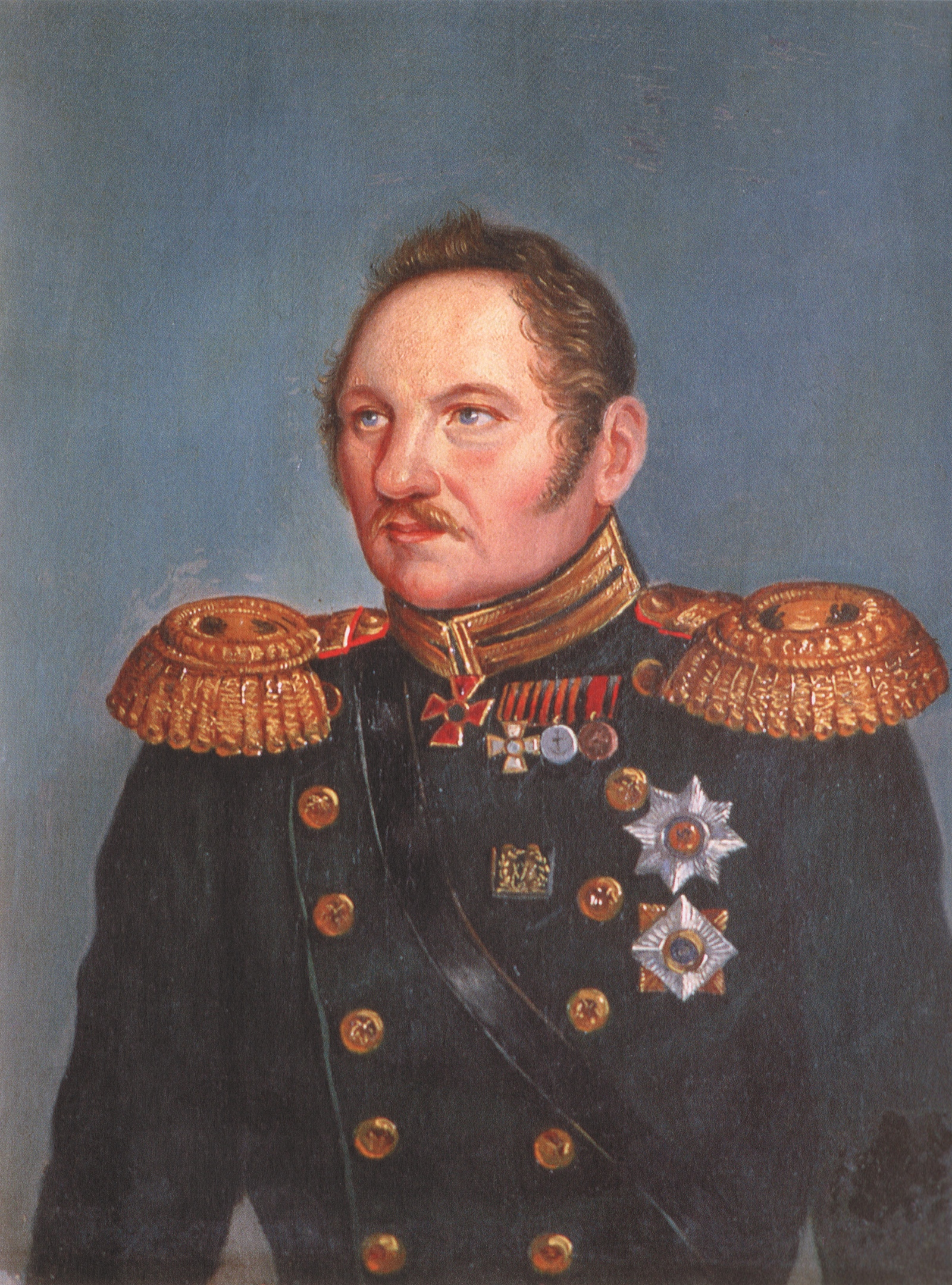
- Portrait by an unknown artist
- Born: 20 September [O.S. 9 September] 1778; Lahhentagge manor, Saaremaa, Governorate of Livonia, Russian Empire
- Died: 25 January [O.S. 13 January] 1852 (aged 73); Kronstadt, Saint Petersburg, Russian Empire
- Other names: Faddey Faddeyevich Bellingshausen; Thaddeus Gottlieb Thaddevich von Bellingshausen
- Military career
- Allegiance: Russia
- Branch: Imperial Russian Navy
- Service years: 1795–1852
- Rank: Admiral
- Conflicts: Russo-Turkish War; Siege of Varna
- Awards: Order of Saint George 4th Class; Order of Saint Vladimir 3rd Class

Faddey Faddeyevich Bellingshausen (Note: In this name that follows East Slavic naming customs, the patronymic is Faddeyevich and the family name is Bellingshausen.) (Note: Russian: Фаддей Фаддеевич Беллинсгаузен, romanized: Faddey Faddeyevich Bellinsgauzen, pronounced [fɐˈdʲej fɐˈdʲe(j)ɪvʲɪdʑ bʲɪlʲɪnzˈɡaʊzʲɪn]. Bellinsgauzen is a russified form of Bellingshausen. Alternatives to romanization: • First name: Faddei, Faddej, Faddeĭ; • Patronymic: Faddeevich, Faddeyevič, Faddeevič.; Faddei Faddeevich Bellingshausen according to the AuDB. Faddey Faddeyevich Bellingshausen in Dictionary.com (one of the possible variants). Estonian: Faddei Faddejevitš Bellingshausen.) or Fabian Gottlieb Benjamin von Bellingshausen (Note: German pronunciation: [ˈfaːbi̯aːn ˈɡɔtliːp ˈbɛnjamiːn fɔn ˈbɛlɪŋsˌhaʊzn̩]. In addition to the German variant name Fabian Gottlieb Benjamin found in his baptismal record, there is Thaddeus Gottlieb Thaddevich. Thaddeus is the German equivalent of Faddey.) (Note: ‹The template German title von is being considered for deletion.› In German personal names, von is a preposition which approximately means 'of' or 'from' and usually denotes some sort of nobility. While von (always lower case) is part of the family name or territorial designation, not a first or middle name, if the noble is referred to by their last name, use Schiller, Clausewitz or Goethe, not von Schiller, etc.) (20 September [O.S. 9 September] 1778 – 25 January [O.S. 13 January] 1852) was a Russian cartographer, explorer, and naval officer of Baltic German descent, who attained the rank of admiral. He participated in the first Russian circumnavigation of the globe, and subsequently became a leader of another circumnavigation expedition that discovered the continent of Antarctica. Like Otto von Kotzebue and Adam Johann von Krusenstern, Bellingshausen belonged to a cohort of prominent Baltic German navigators which helped Russia launch its naval expeditions.

Bellingshausen was born on the island of Saaremaa (Ösel), to the Bellingshausen family. He started his service in the Russian Baltic Fleet, and after distinguishing himself joined the first Russian circumnavigation of the Earth in 1803–1806, serving on the merchant ship Nadezhda under the captaincy of Adam Johann von Krusenstern. After the journey, he published a collection of maps of the newly explored areas and islands of the Pacific Ocean. Subsequently, he commanded several ships of the Baltic and Black Sea Fleets.

As a prominent cartographer, Bellingshausen was appointed to command the Russian circumnavigation of the globe in 1819–1821, intended to explore the Southern Ocean and to find land in the proximity of the South Pole. Mikhail Lazarev prepared the expedition and was made Bellingshausen's second-in-command and the captain of the sloop Mirny, while Bellingshausen himself commanded the sloop Vostok. During this expedition, Bellingshausen and Lazarev became the first explorers to see the land of Antarctica on 27 January 1820 (New Style), disproving James Cook's contention that it was impossible to find land in the southern ice-fields. They circumnavigated the continent twice and never lost each other from view. The expedition discovered and named Peter I, Zavodovski, Leskov, Alexander, and Visokoi Islands, the Antarctic Peninsula, and made other discoveries in the tropical waters of the Pacific.

Made captain-commodore on his return, Bellingshausen participated in the Russo-Turkish War of 1828–1829. Promoted to vice admiral, he again served in the Baltic Fleet in the 1830s. From 1839, he was a military governor of Kronstadt, and gained the rank of admiral in 1843. In 1831, he published the book on his Antarctic travels, called Double Investigation of the Southern Polar Ocean and the Voyage Around the World. (Note: Original title in Russian: Двукратные изыскания в южнополярном океане и плавание вокруг света, romanized: Dvukratnyye izyskaniya v yuzhnopolyarnom okeane i plavaniye vokrug sveta.)

== Early life and career ==
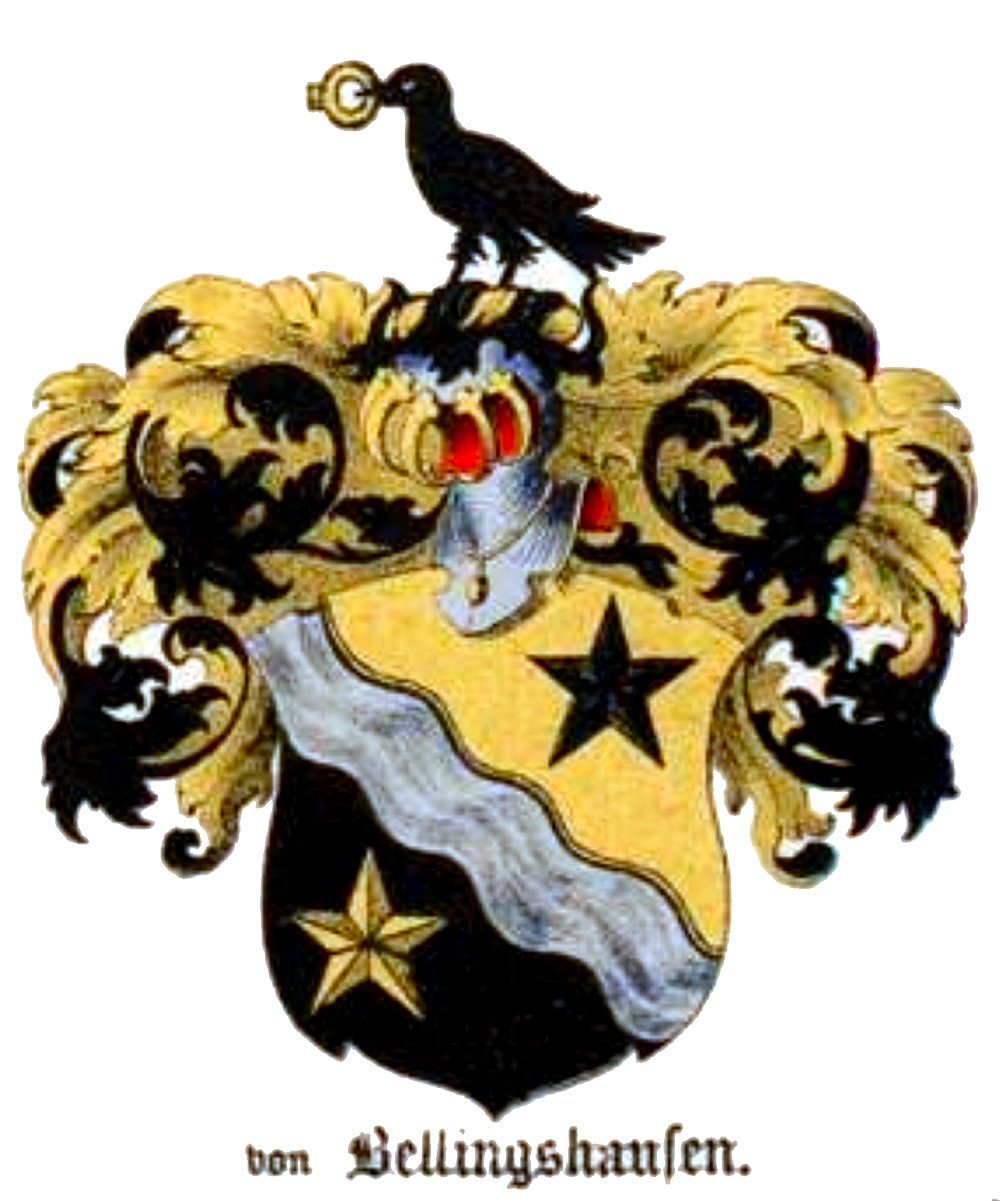
Coat of arms of the Bellingshausen family

Bellingshausen was born into the Baltic German noble Bellingshausen family in the Lahhetagge Manor, Ösel County in the Governorate of Livonia of the Russian Empire; now Saare County, Estonia. His paternal family had Holsteinish origins; the surname Bellingshausen was first recorded in Lübeck. He enlisted as a cadet in the Imperial Russian Navy at the age of ten. After graduating from the Kronstadt naval academy at age eighteen, Bellingshausen rapidly rose to the rank of captain.

== First Russian circumnavigation ==
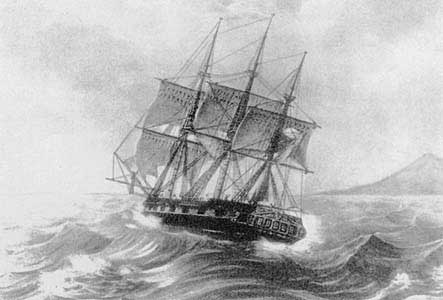
Nadezdha, on which Bellingshausen served under captain Krusenstern during the first Russian circumnavigation.

A great admirer of Cook's voyages, Bellingshausen served from 1803 in the first Russian circumnavigation of the Earth. He was one of the officers of the vessel Nadezhda ("Hope"), commanded by Adam Johann von Krusenstern. The mission was completed in 1806. After the journey, Bellingshausen published a collection of maps of the newly explored areas and islands of the Pacific Ocean.

== Service as captain ==
Bellingshausen's career continued with the command of various ships in the Baltic and Black Seas. From 1812 to 1816, he commanded the frigate Minerva and from 1817 to 1819 the frigate Flora, both in the Black Sea Fleet. During 1812 he met on Macquarie Island, half-way between New Zealand and Antarctica, Richard Siddins, the Australian captain of the ship Campbell Macquarie.

== First Russian Antarctic expedition ==
The First Russian Antarctic expedition 1819–1821

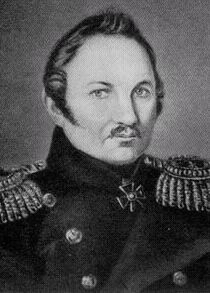
Captain Faddey Bellingshausen with the Cross of the Order of St. Vladimir

When Emperor Alexander I authorized an expedition to the south polar region in 1819, the authorities selected Bellingshausen to lead it as an experienced captain and explorer, and a prominent cartographer. The expedition was intended to explore the Southern Ocean and to find land in the proximity of the South Pole. The preparation work on the two ships, the 985-ton sloop-of-war Vostok ("East") and the 530-ton support vessel Mirny ("Peaceful") was carried out by Mikhail Lazarev, who had captained his own circumnavigation of the globe before. Bellingshausen became the captain of Vostok, and Lazarev captained Mirny. The journey started from Kronstadt on 4 June 1819. They stopped briefly in England, where Bellingshausen met with Sir Joseph Banks, the president of the Royal Society. Banks had sailed with Captain James Cook fifty years earlier and supplied the Russians with books and charts for their expedition.

Leaving Portsmouth on 5 September 1819 the expedition crossed the Antarctic Circle (the first to do so since Cook) on 26 January 1820 (New Style). On 27 January, the expedition discovered the Antarctic mainland approaching the Antarctic coast at a point with coordinates 69º21'28"S 2º14'50"W and seeing ice-fields there. The point in question lies within twenty miles of the Antarctic mainland. Bellingshausen's diary, his report to the Russian Naval Minister on 21 July 1821 and other documents, available in the Russian State Museum of the Arctic and Antarctic in Saint Petersburg, Russia, were carefully compared with the log-books of other claimants by the British polar historian A. G. E. Jones in his 1982 study Antarctica Observed. Jones concluded that Bellingshausen, rather than the Royal Navy's Edward Bransfield on 30 January 1820 or the American Nathaniel Palmer on 17 November 1820, was indeed the discoverer of the sought-after Terra Australis. The first one to land and not only see the continental part of Antarctica may have been Andrew MacFarlane, a Scottish to the service of Chile in October 1820, as well as the American John Davis in February 1821.

During the voyage Bellingshausen also visited Meretoto / Ship Cove in New Zealand, the South Shetland Islands, and discovered and named Peter I, Zavodovski, Leskov and Visokoi Islands, and a peninsula of the Antarctic mainland that he named the Alexander Coast, but that has more recently borne the designation of Alexander Island.

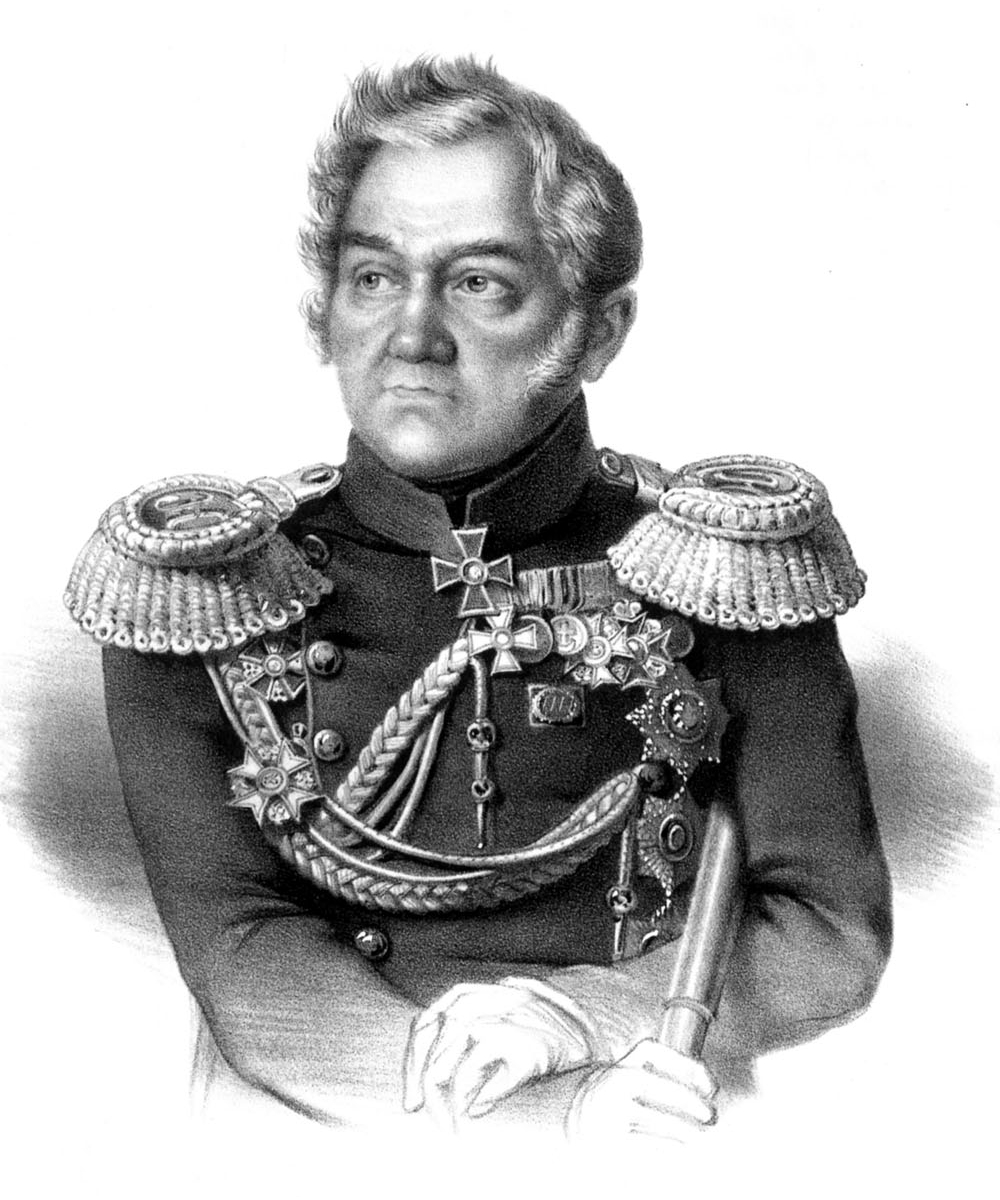
Mikhail Lazarev, captain of Mirny and second-in-command to Bellingshausen during the Antarctic expedition.

Bellingshausen and Lazarev managed to twice circumnavigate the continent and never lost each other from view. Thus, they disproved Cook's assertion that it was impossible to find land in the southern ice fields. The expedition also made discoveries and observations in the tropical waters of the Pacific Ocean.

== Admiral ==
Returning to Kronstadt on 4 August 1821, Bellingshausen was made captain-commodore, and received the rank of counter admiral from tsar Nicholas I in 1826. He fought in the Russo-Turkish War of 1828–1829, — particularly in the siege of Varna, was promoted to vice admiral in 1830, served as a military governor of port Kronstadt at the approaches to St Petersburg, and gained the rank of admiral in 1843. In 1831, he published the book on his Antarctic travel, called Double Investigation of the Southern Polar Ocean and the Voyage Around the World.

== Military governor of Kronstadt ==
In 1839 he became a military governor of Kronstadt, the main base of Russian Baltic Fleet, and died there in 1852.

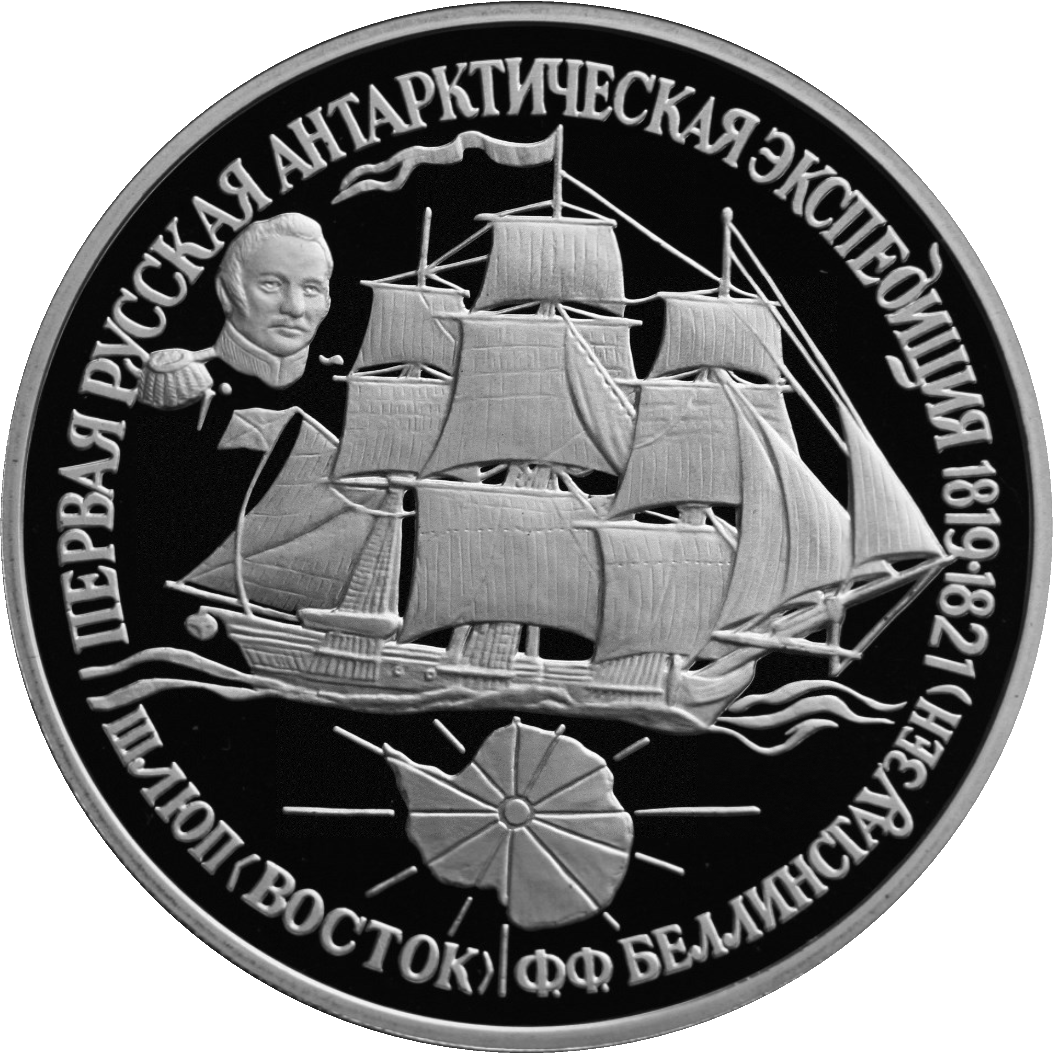
A commemorative coin of the Bank of Russia dedicated to the first Russian Antarctic expedition

== Legacy ==
Fabian Gottlieb von Bellingshausen is remembered in Russia as one of its greatest admirals and explorers. In the Antarctic, multiple geographical features and locations, named in honor of Bellingshausen, remind of his role in exploration of the southern polar region.

=== Monuments ===
There is a memorial stone of Bellingshausen on the previous site (on the ruins) of Lahhentagge/Lahetaguse manor in Ösel/Saaremaa.

There is a monument to Bellingshausen in Mykolaiv, Ukraine, as well as in Rio de Janeiro, Brazil and in Montevideo, Uruguay.

There is a monument to Admiral Bellingshausen in Kronstadt, near Saint Petersburg in Russia.

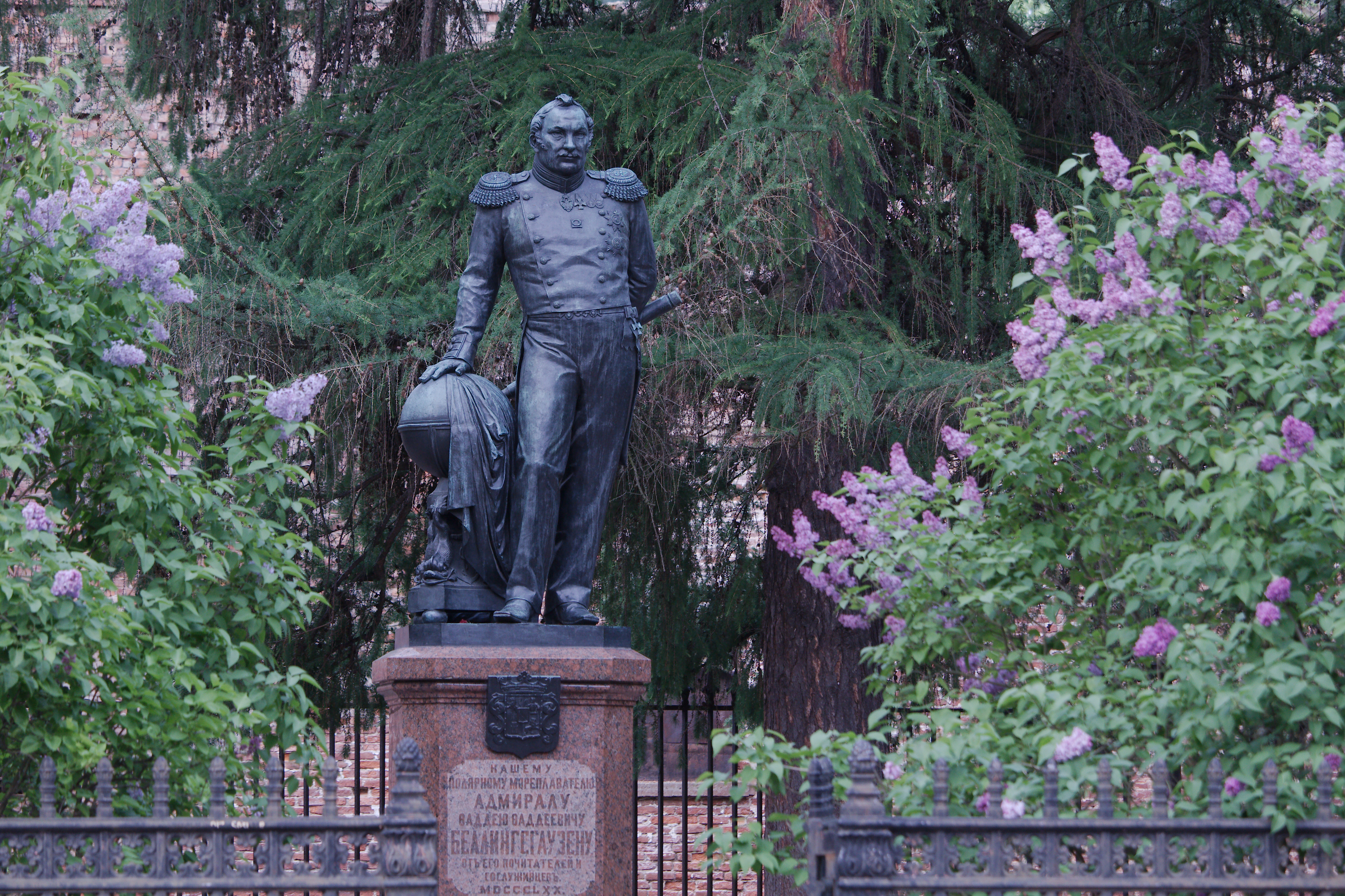
Monument to Bellingshausen in Kronstadt, Russia

=== Named in honour ===
- Bellingshausen Island (was) in the Aral Sea.
- Bellingshausen Island in the south Atlantic Ocean, part of the South Sandwich Islands
- Bellingshausen Sea in the Southern Ocean
- Bellingshausen Station, a Russian (former Soviet) base on King George Island, Antarctica
- Bellingshausen Plate, an ancient tectonic plate
- Bellinsgauzen, a crater on the far side of the Moon
- Faddey Islands in the Laptev Sea coastal region on the north Russian coast, named after Bellingshausen's first name in Russian
- Motu One (Society Islands), also known as Bellinghausen, an atoll in the Pacific Ocean
- A minor planet 3659 Bellingshausen, discovered by Soviet astronomer Lyudmila Chernykh in 1969

== See also ==
- History of Antarctica
- List of Baltic German explorers
