= Leskov Island =

Island in the South Sandwich Islands

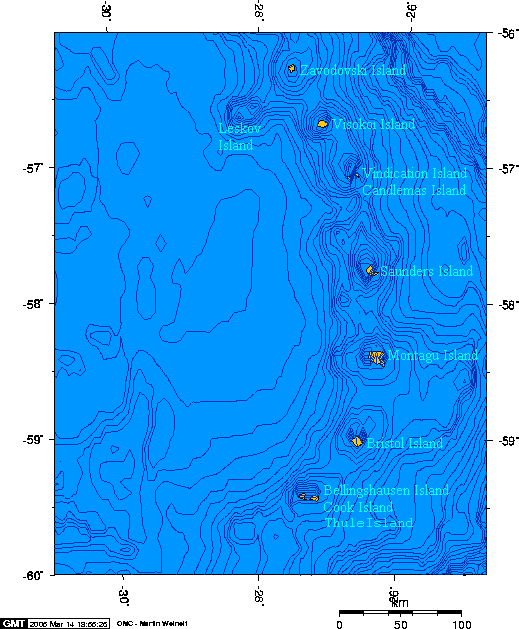
- South Sandwich Islands

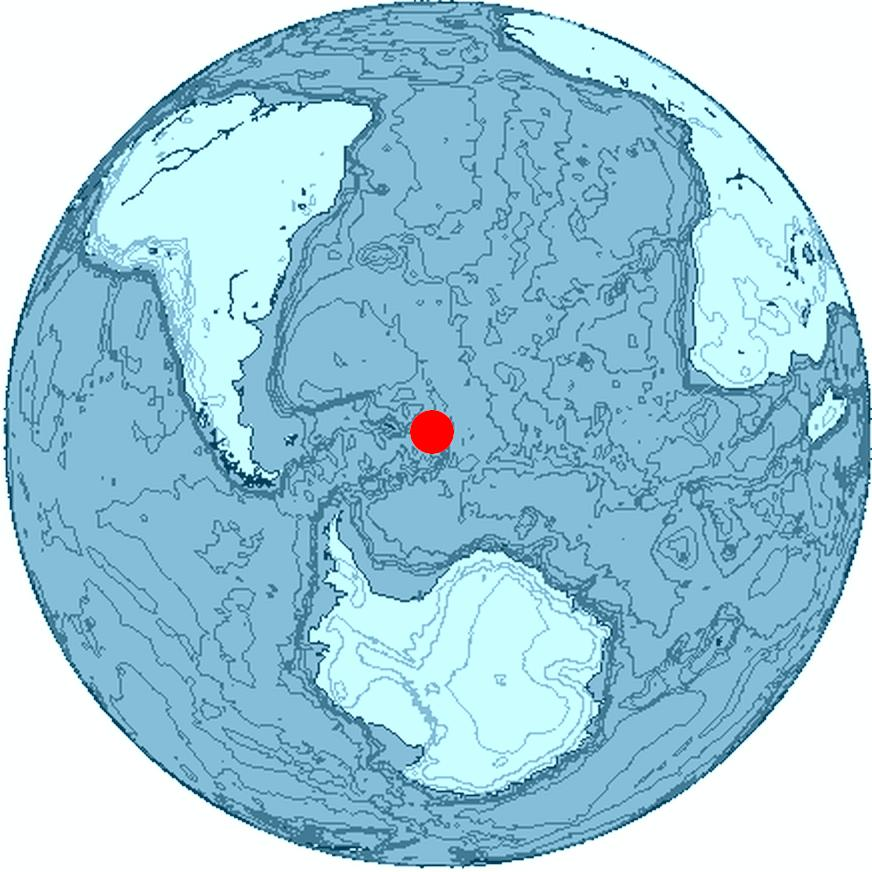
- Location of Leskov Island

Geography
- Coordinates: 56°40′21″S 28°06′00″W
- Length: 1.5 km (0.93 mi)

Administration
- United Kingdom

Demographics
- Population: Uninhabited

Leskov Island is one of the three Traversay Islands that form a subgroup of the South Sandwich Islands, in the Southern Ocean.

The island is named after Russian sailor Arcady Leskov. It is a semicircular 190 metres (620 ft) high eroded volcano with a large bay on its eastern side. Leskov Island is almost entirely surrounded by cliffs and has a surface area of 0.55 by 0.93 kilometres (0.34 mi × 0.58 mi). Volcanic rocks form tuffs and lava and consist almost entirely of andesite.

There are no known historical eruptions, but there is widespread fumarolic activity which has varied over time. Mosses and liverworts grow next to the fumaroles, but this vegetation also occurs away from the vents. Several seabirds have been observed nesting on the island.

== Geography and geomorphology ==
The South Sandwich Islands in the Southern Ocean, which include Leskov Island, lie at the eastern margin of the Scotia Sea and were discovered in 1775 by James Cook. The islands have had little human presence, with only sporadic research efforts during the 20th and 21st century. They are all active volcanoes, whose summits emerge above sea level. The South American Plate subducts beneath the Scotia Plate in the South Sandwich Trench, causing the volcanism of these islands. Leskov is located 60 kilometres (37 mi) southwest of Zavodovski Island, west of the main volcanic arc. These islands form the northern group (Traversay Islands) of the South Sandwich Islands. It was discovered in December 1821 by von Bellingshausen, and named after the first lieutenant of one of his ships, Arcady Lyeskov. Leskov Island has a harsh climate, with rough seas and poor weather, rendering it difficult to access.

The island has dimensions of 0.55 by 0.93 kilometres (0.34 mi × 0.58 mi), making it the smallest of the South Sandwich Islands. Its highest point is 190 metres (620 ft) and it has a semicircular shape with the blunt end to the southwest and Crater Bay on the northeastern side. The bay is bordered by cliffs up to 120 metres (390 ft) high and may be a crater. At its northern end sits Bowsprit Point, a northeast-trending peninsula that rises steep from the sea and which delimits another smaller bay to the north. The southeastern cape of the island, Rudder Point, is formed by a steep pinnacle and connected through a narrow neck with the rest of Leskov Island. The names of these capes refer to their appearance, resembling the bowsprit and the rudder of a ship. The southern and western sides of the island feature a terrace separated by two cliffs reaching heights of 60 metres (200 ft), with gullies cutting into the slopes. Steep cliffs form the northern margin of the island, and are sometimes undermined by caves. There are no beaches. The submarine slopes on the eastern and southeastern side show traces of underwater mass failures.

Leskov Island is formed by lava and tuffs, the ground covered with blocks, lapilli, talus and volcanic ash. A pyroclastic sequence is exposed on a platform above the eastern coast, and may have originated from a vent on the platform. The volcanic rocks have been subdivided into three sequences, two lavic ones and one of volcanic ash. Leskov Island lacks permanent ice, owing to its low altitude, but there is evidence of solifluction.

=== Eruption history and fumarolic activity ===
Potassium-argon dating has yielded ages of 500,000 ± 1,000,000 or 700,000 years and the island has an eroded appearance. It probably is the remnant of a volcano that once was considerably larger. It is possible that an original volcanic cone was breached by marine erosion on the western flank, with lava pouring out through the breach; then erosion removed the original cone and only the lava was left. An interpretation published in 2013 implies that it might be a lava dome disrupted by later explosive eruptions. No historical eruptions are known and the island did not change shape between 1931 and 1962 or 1819 and the 20th century.

Fumarolic activity was reported in 1911, 1961 and 1964, with further observations reported in 1997. Steam rising from fumaroles can occasionally be seen from the sea. Fumaroles form complex vents, fissures and cracks, mostly on the summit ridge, the steep eastern slope of the island and in shallow water east of Leskov. Most of the fumaroles emit water vapour, but there are reports of a sulfurous smell; close to fumarolic vents the rocks show signs of fumarolic alteration. One fumarole had a temperature exceeding 30 °C (86 °F) in 1997. Fumarolic activity appears to have declined between 1964 and 1997, leading to the decline of the associated vegetation.

=== Composition ===
The composition of the volcanic rocks is largely uniform and defines a calc-alkaline two-pyroxene andesite suite, an uncommon chemistry in the South Sandwich Islands. They contain phenocrysts of plagioclase, with augite, hypersthene and magnetite being rarer and hornblende, olivine and quartz are uncommon. Gabbro and norite have also been recovered. The chemistry may reflect the position of Leskov Island, where the slab is deeper than below the main arc, and thus ascending magmas undergo more fractionation than at the main islands.

=== Submarine parts ===
Leskov Island rises from a 19.5 kilometres (12.1 mi) wide base at a depth of 2,500 metres (8,200 ft); the total volume of the edifice, including its submarine parts, is about 234 cubic kilometres (56 cu mi). The island lies on a submarine ridge that extends to Zavodovski Island. Two seamounts, Vostok and Mirnyi, are located southwest and northeast of Leskov Island. The island may be possibly part of a secondary volcanic arc, although its position on a ridge connected with the main arc argues otherwise.

== Vegetation and animals ==
Algae, liverworts and mosses grow on Leskov Island, often on hot ground and close to fumaroles. Vegetation clusters around fumaroles reach widths of 20 metres (66 ft), while distinct vegetation communities are found away from the fumaroles. Lichens cover the rocks and at least one mushroom has been reported. Collemboles and mites occur in the plant mats. Cape petrels, dove prions, snow petrels, and southern fulmars have been observed nesting on the island. Penguins and seals are lacking, probably because of the inaccessible coasts.

== See also ==
- List of Antarctic and sub-Antarctic islands
