= South Sandwich Islands =

Island chain in South Atlantic Ocean

Disputed island
- South Sandwich Islands

- Location of the South Sandwich Islands

Geography
- Coordinates: 56°36′S 027°43′W
- Archipelago: South Sandwich Islands
- Total islands: 11
- Area: 310 km^{2} (120 sq mi)

Administration
- United Kingdom
- Overseas Territory: South Georgia and the South Sandwich Islands

Claimed by
- Argentina
- Province: Tierra del Fuego

Demographics
- Population: Uninhabited

Map of the South Sandwich Islands in relation to the neighbouring island of South Georgia

The South Sandwich Islands are a chain of uninhabited volcanic islands in the South Atlantic Ocean. They are administered as part of the British Overseas Territory of South Georgia and the South Sandwich Islands. The chain lies in the sub-Antarctic region, about 700 kilometres (430 mi) southeast of South Georgia and 1,700 kilometres (1,100 mi) northeast from the tip of the Antarctic Peninsula.

The archipelago comprises 11 main islands forming an island arc running north–south, the largest being Montagu at 110 square kilometres (42 sq mi). It is divided into four groups, from north to south: The Traversay, Candlemas and Central Islands (Saunders, Montagu, and Bristol), and Southern Thule.

The archipelago is prone to violent earthquakes. Over the previous century, nine M 7+ earthquakes have occurred here, the most recent being the M 8.1 in August 2021. None of these earthquakes are known to have caused fatalities due to their remote location in the Southern Ocean.

== History ==
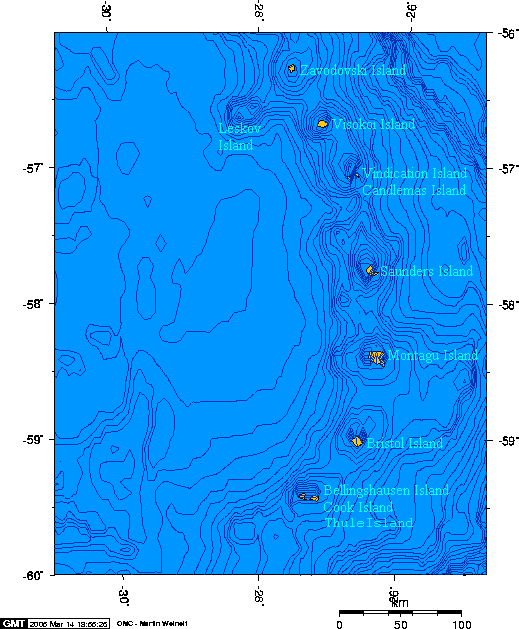
Bathymetry of the Atlantic Ocean around the South Sandwich Islands

The southern eight islands of the South Sandwich Islands were discovered by Captain James Cook in 1775 during his second voyage aboard HMS Resolution. On 31 January, Cook described sighting "three rocky islots of considerable height", naming the outermost "Freezland Peak" after the sailor who first spotted it. He named the area "Sandwich Land" in honor of John Montagu, 4th Earl of Sandwich, then First Lord of the Admiralty. The designation "South" was later added to distinguish these islands from the "Sandwich Islands", now known as Hawaii.

The northern three islands (Zavodovski, Leskov, and Visokoi), collectively known as the Traversay Islands—were discovered in November 1819 by a Russian expedition led by Fabian Gottlieb von Bellingshausen aboard the sloop Vostok, with Mikhail Lazarev commanding the Mirny. The group was named in honor of Jean-Baptiste Prevost de Sansac, Marquis de Traversay, the Russian Minister of Naval Affairs.

The United Kingdom formally annexed the South Sandwich Islands through letters patent in 1908, grouping them into the Falkland Islands Dependencies alongside South Georgia, the South Orkneys, the South Shetlands, and Graham Land.

Argentina claimed the South Sandwich Islands in 1938 and challenged British sovereignty in the islands on several occasions. From 25 January 1955 through the summer of 1956 Argentina maintained the summer station Teniente Esquivel at Ferguson Bay on the southeastern coast of Thule Island. From 1976 to 1982, Argentina maintained a naval base named Corbeta Uruguay in the lee (southern east coast) of the same island. Although the British discovered the presence of the Argentine base in 1976, protested, and tried to resolve the issue by diplomatic means, no effort was made to remove them by force until after the Falklands War. The base was eventually removed on 20 June 1982 and the installations were demolished in December of that year.

The territory of "South Georgia and the South Sandwich Islands" was formed in 1985; previously, both archipelagos had been governed as part of the Falkland Islands Dependencies.

On 10 February 2008, an earthquake of magnitude 6.5 on the Richter Scale had its epicenter 205 km (127 mi) south-southeast of Bristol Island. On 30 June 2008, an earthquake of magnitude 7.0 struck the region. Its epicentre was at 243 km (151 mi) away from Bristol Island, at a depth of 8 km (5.0 mi).

== Geography ==
The northernmost of the South Sandwich Islands form the Traversay Islands and Candlemas Islands groups, while the southernmost make up Southern Thule. The three largest islands – Saunders, Montagu, and Bristol – lie between the two. The islands’ highest point is Mount Belinda (1,370 m or 4,495 ft) on Montagu Island. The fourth highest peak, Mount Michael (990 m or 3,248 ft) on Saunders Island has a persistent lava lake, known to occur at only eight volcanoes in the world.

The South Sandwich Islands are uninhabited, although an illegal permanently staffed Argentine research station was located on Thule Island from 1976 to 1982 (for details, see § History above). Automatic weather stations are on Thule Island and Zavodovski. To the northwest of Zavodovski Island is the Protector Shoal, a submarine volcano.

The South Sandwich Islands from north to south are:

Island (Spanish name)	Area	Highest peak	Location
Traversay Islands (Archipiélago Marqués de Traverse)
Protector Shoal	–	−27 m (−89 ft)	55°54′S 28°06′W
Zavodovski	25 km^{2} (9.7 sq mi)	Mount Asphyxia; 550 m (1,800 ft)	56°18′S 27°34′W
Leskov	0.3 km^{2} (0.12 sq mi)	Rudder Point; 190 m (620 ft)	56°40′S 28°08′W
Visokoi	35 km^{2} (14 sq mi)	Mount Hodson; 915 m (3,002 ft)	56°42′S 27°13′W
Candlemas Islands (sometimes included with Traversay Islands) (Islas Candelaria)
Candlemas (Candelaria)	14 km^{2} (5.4 sq mi)	Mount Andromeda; 550 m (1,800 ft)	57°05′S 26°39′W
Vindication (Vindicación)	5 km^{2} (1.9 sq mi)	Quadrant Peak; 430 m (1,410 ft)	57°06′S 26°47′W
Central islands
Saunders	40 km^{2} (15 sq mi)	Mount Michael; 990 m (3,250 ft)	57°48′S 26°28′W
Montagu (Jorge)	110 km^{2} (42 sq mi)	Mount Belinda; 1,370 m (4,490 ft)	58°25′S 26°23′W
Bristol (Blanco) or (Blanca)	46 km^{2} (18 sq mi)	Mount Darnley; 1,100 m (3,600 ft)	59°03′S 26°30′W
Southern Thule (Tule del Sur)
Bellingshausen	1 km^{2} (0.39 sq mi)	Basilisk Peak; 255 m (837 ft)	59°25′S 27°05′W
Cook	20 km^{2} (7.7 sq mi)	Mount Harmer; 1,115 m (3,658 ft)	59°26′S 27°09′W
Thule (or Morrell) Island	14 km^{2} (5.4 sq mi)	Mount Larsen; 710 m (2,330 ft)	59°27′S 27°18′W
Vysokaya Bank	–	−89 m (−292 ft)	59°43′S 27°58′W
Total	310 km^{2} (120 sq mi)	Mount Belinda; 1,370 m (4,490 ft)	

Several straits and passages separate the South Sandwich Islands. Forsters Passage separates Bristol Island and Southern Thule. Nelson Channel is the passage between Candlemas and Vindication Island. Douglas Strait separates Thule Island and Cook Island.

== See also ==
- List of Antarctic and subantarctic islands
- Flora of the South Sandwich Islands
