= Salamander (disambiguation) =

A salamander is an amphibian.

Salamander may also refer to:

== In mythology ==
- Salamander (legendary creature)

== In arts and entertainment ==
=== In film and television and on stage ===
- Salamander (anime), a video mini-series
- Salamander (TV series), from Belgium
- The Salamander (1916 film), an adaptation of Owen Johnson's 1913 novel
- Salamander (film), a 1928 Soviet-German silent biopic
- The Salamander (1971 film), a Swiss film directed by Alain Tanner
- The Salamander (1981 film), starring Anthony Quinn
- A fictional character in the Doctor Who serial The Enemy of the World
- Fiametta, also known as The Salamander, an 1863 Russian ballet

=== In gaming ===
- Salamander (video game), a scrolling shooter arcade game
  - Salamander 2, its sequel
- Salamander (Dungeons & Dragons), a fictional creature
- Salamanders (Warhammer 40,000), a fictional military force

=== In literature ===
- The Salamander, a novel by Owen Johnson that was also adapted into films
- Salamander (novel), 2002, by Thomas Wharton
- Salamander: A Miscellany of Poetry, a 1947 anthology
- Salamander, a literary magazine at Suffolk University
- The nickname of fictional character Natsu Dragneel in the manga Fairy Tail
- The nickname of fictional character Honor Harrington

=== In music ===
- An album by Doug Gillard
- A song by Ellegarden on their album Eleven Fire Crackers
- A song by Jethro Tull on their album Too Old to Rock 'n' Roll: Too Young to Die!

== Places ==
- Salamander Range, a mountain range in Victoria Land, Antarctica
- Salamander Glacier, Montana, United States
- Salamander Point, Bellingshausen Island, South Sandwich Islands

== Military ==
- HMS Salamander, various Royal Navy ships
- SMS Salamander, various Austrian, German and Prussian navy ships
- Salamander of Leith (1537), a ship of the Old Scots Navy
- Sopwith Salamander, a British First World War ground-attack biplane
- Salamander, a nickname for the Heinkel He 162 Volksjäger, a Second World War German jet; also the name of its construction program

== Technology ==
- Salamander (metallurgy), materials in the hearth of a blast furnace below its tap hole
- Salamander heater, a portable space heater
- Salamander broiler, a type of grilling equipment
- Altap Salamander, file management software
- Alvis Salamander, a fire engine

== Other uses ==
- Salamander Energy, a former British-based oil and gas company
- Salamander Washington DC Hotel
- SV Salamander Türkheim, a German association football club
- The nickname given to Bernard Freyberg, 1st Baron Freyberg by Winston Churchill
- Cheat Mountain Salamander, a Durbin and Greenbrier Valley Railroad excursion train

== See also ==
- The salamander letter, a 1980s-era forgery intended to discredit the Latter Day Saints movement and its founder, Joseph Smith
- Salamanda (band), a South Korean leftfield ambient duo
- Salamandra (disambiguation)
- Salamandre (disambiguation)
