= Arsameia =

Coordinates: 37°56′34″N 38°39′25″E

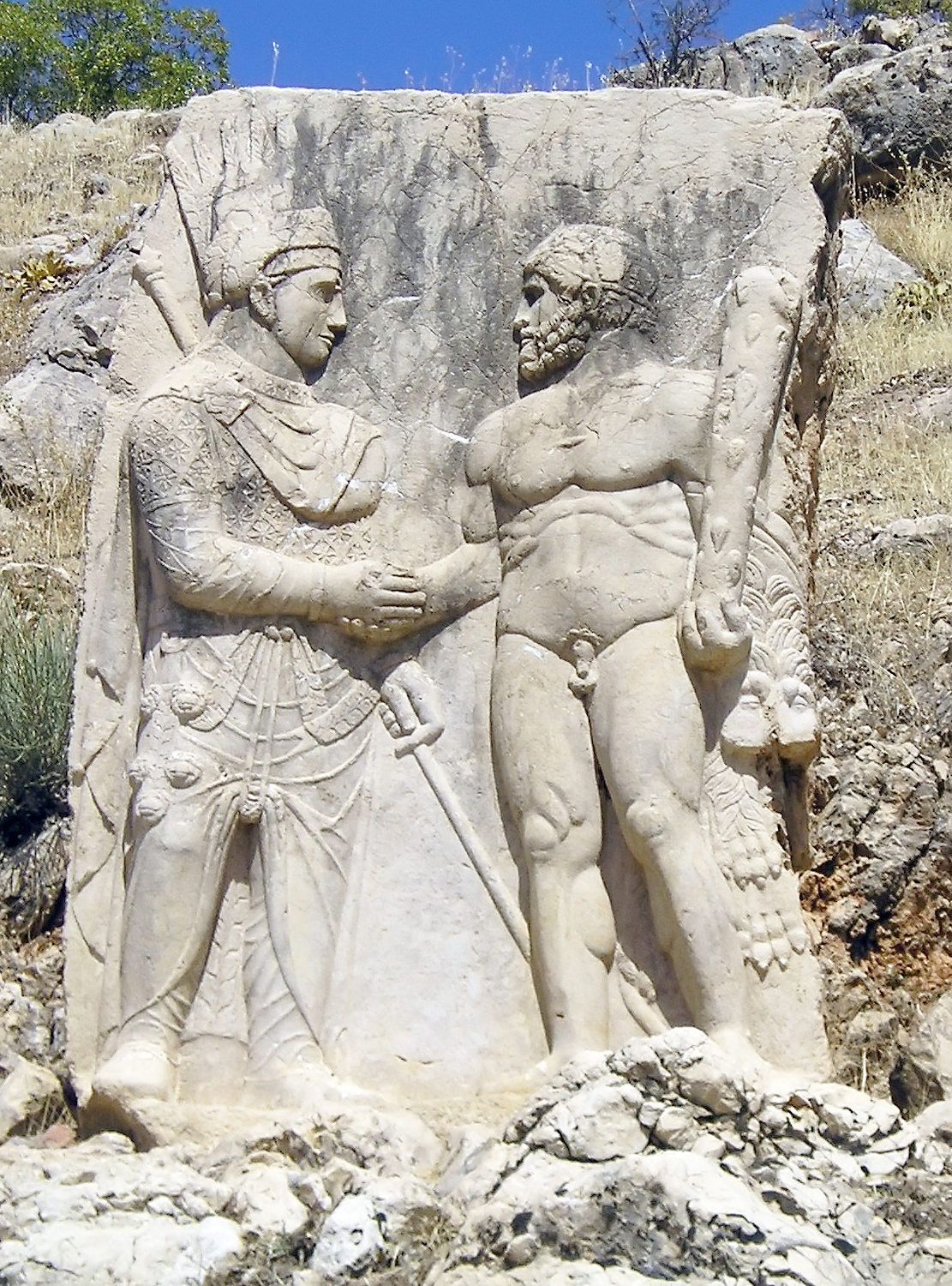
King Mithridates or Antiochus I of Commagene shaking hands with Heracles

Arsameia on the Nymphaios (Armenian: Արշամաշատ, romanized: Arshamashat; Turkish: Eski Kale – "Old Castle") is an ancient city located in Old Kâhta (Eski Kâhta) in Kâhta district, Adıyaman Province, Turkey. The site is near Kâhtaçay, known in ancient times as Nymphaios. Arsameia was a royal seat of the kingdom of Commagene. It is best known for the Hierothesion of King Mithridates I Kallinikos, built for him by his son and heir Antiochos I.

== History ==
The ancient town of Nymphaios was renamed Arsameia in the third century BCE by the Armenian king Arsames (255–225 BCE). It was then taken in 235 BCE by the Seleukid Antiochus Hierax who was fleeing from his brother Seleucus II, who was later claimed as an ancestor by the Commagenian King Antiochus I. The city had already been abandoned again by Roman times: Stones were robbed from local graves by Roman soldiers for building bridges.

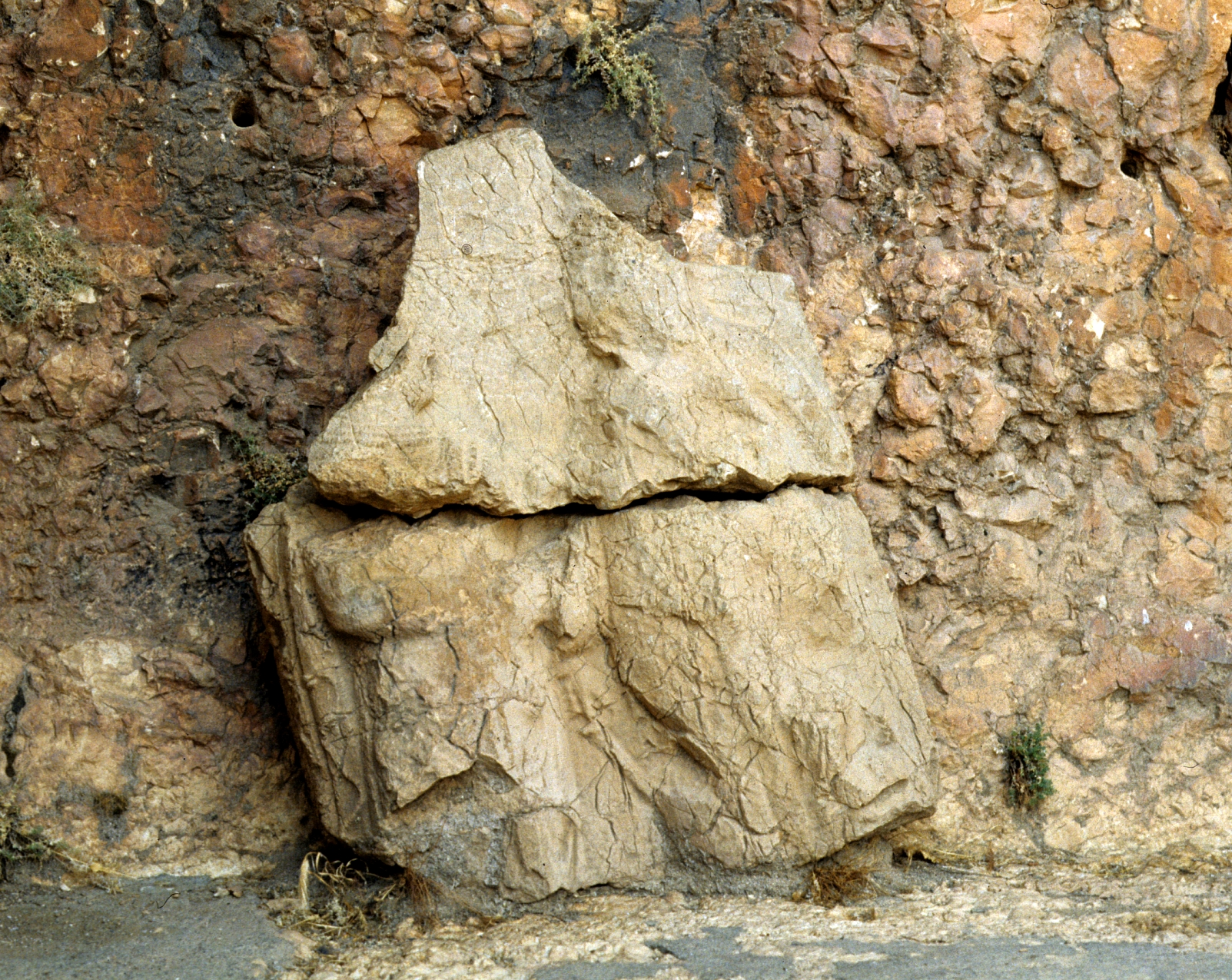
Dexiosis-fragment at site I, to the upper right the auriole around the head of Mithras

== Hierothesion ==
The Greek word hierothesion (ἱεροθέσιον) is term for the holy burial areas of those belonging to the royal house, and is only known from Commagene. Apart from the Hierothesion which Antiochos himself built on Nemrut Dağı, and the second one on Karakuş which his son Mithridates II built for the female members of the royal house, a third is to be found in Arsameia, the burial site and the associated cultic area for Antiochus' father Mithridates. A processional way leads up the mountain in the form of a Z and passes three sites which its discoverer Friedrich Karl Dörner marked as Sites I–III. At the first of these, Site II, stands the fragment described as the Mithras relief. It is the right hand side of a dexiosis, which shows Antiochos or Mithridates shaking hands with the sun god Mithras. Antiochus and those associated with him depicted themselves as being on the same level as the gods through these representations which are distributed throughout Commagene. Dörner was able to re-erect the upper and lower halves of Mithras, of the left-hand side of the relief only part of a shoulder was found, which Dörner however identified with one of the kings due to its clothing.

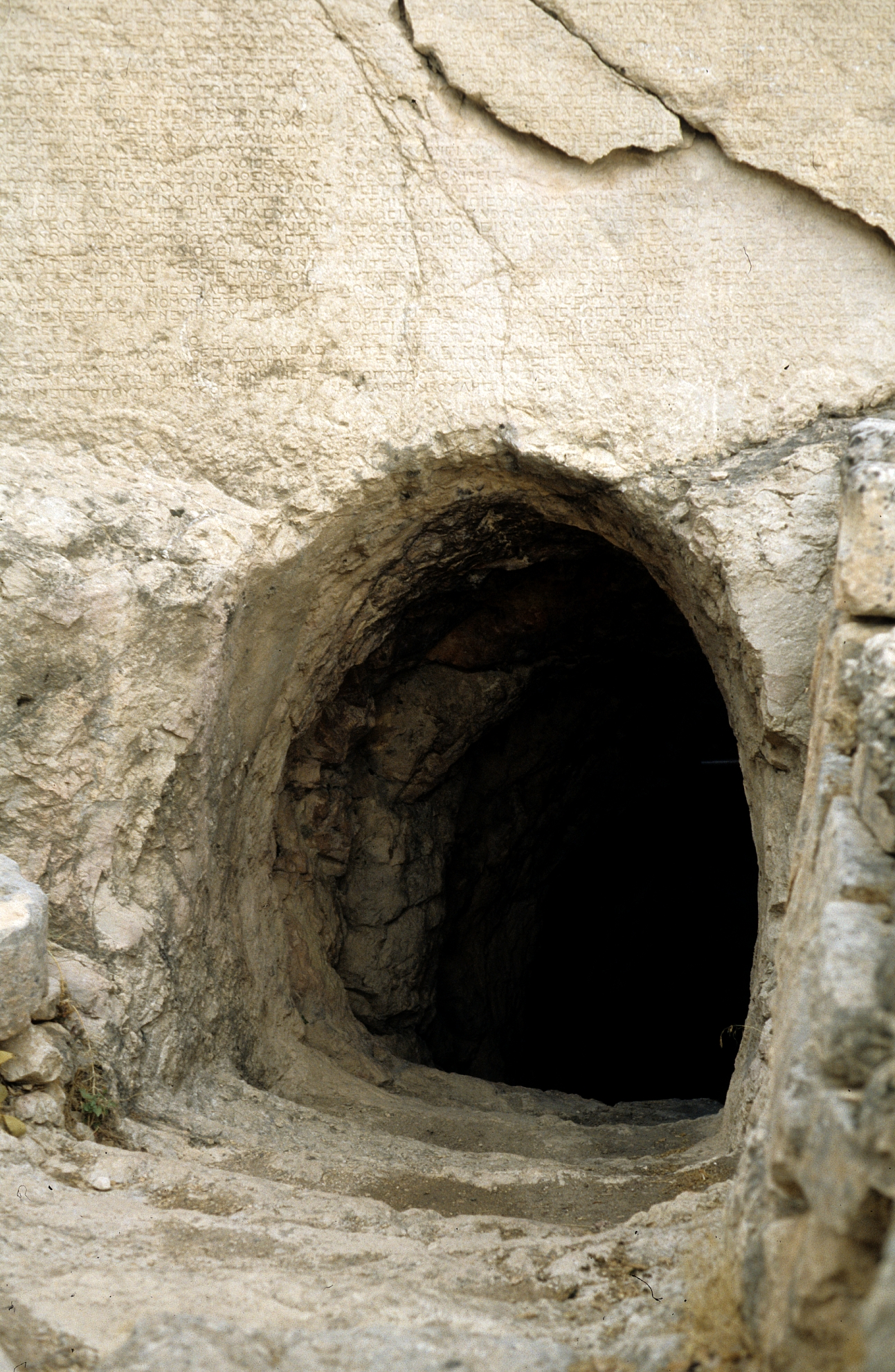
Inscribed wall and entrance to the tunnel at Site III

On the first bend of the path is located Site I. Here too can be seen the remains of the depiction of a dexiosis, in which the portraits can no longer be identified. In addition to this there is a hallway carved into the rock, from which 14 steps lead up to a further room, nine meters high and about eight by eight meters in size. The function of this is not clear; Dörner took it to be a temple to Mithras, while other archaeologists conjecture that it could be the burial site of Mithridates.

The path leads on further to Site III. Here on a wall of rock was found an inscription of Antiochos in five columns, in which he relates the story of how the city was founded and the building of the Hierothesion as well as detailed instructions about how to carry out the rites that needed to be performed. Since the inscription had been almost completely covered in earth from ancient times it is still in an amazing condition. In the lower part of the inscribed wall a walkway begins that goes steeply up the rock and then suddenly ends after 158 metres. Nothing is known about its purpose. Above the wall stands the best preserved dexiosis relief of Commagene. It shows one of the two kings, either Antiochos or Mithridates shaking hands with a naked Herakles, recognizable from his club.

The processional way leads further beyond this site as far as the summit of the mountain. There was found the foundations of buildings with mosaic flooring, which can be dated back to the Second Century before Christ. On the basis of fragments of sculpture Dörner takes it that this is where the mausoleum of Mithridates stood, decorated with statues.

== Yenikale and the Pigeon Castle ==
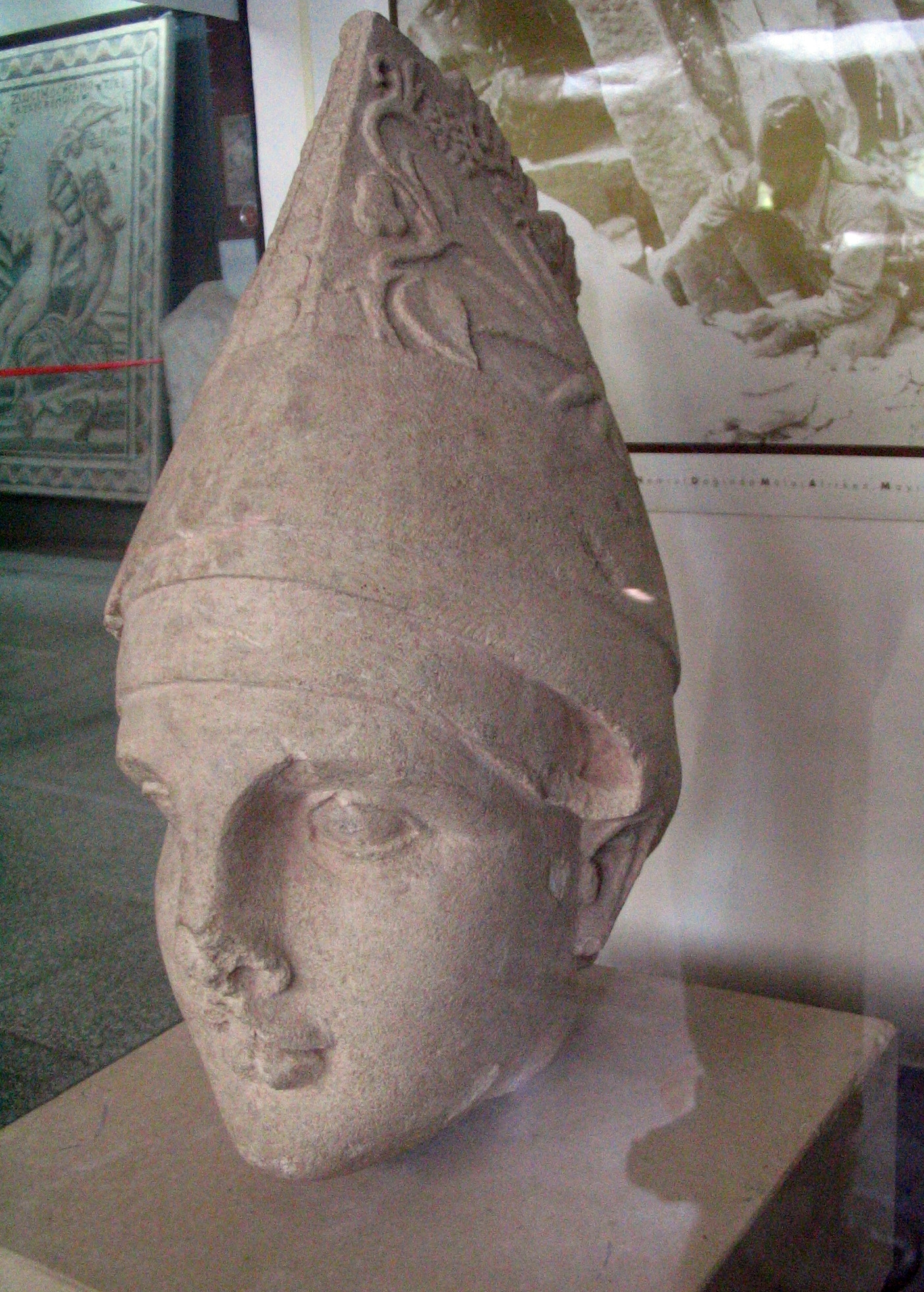
Head of Antiochos from the plateau now in the museum at Gaziantep

About two kilometers away, on the other side of the Kahtaçay, lies the fortress of Yenikale ("New Castle"). Here according to the inscription at Site III lay the Palace buildings of the Commagenian rulers. Today one can see a Mameluke castle. In its interior are found building and restoration inscriptions from the sultans Qala'un (1279–90), Al-Ashraf Khalil (1290–93) and al-Nasir Muhammad (1293–1341). An earlier building had already been conquered and destroyed in 1286 by Kara Sonkar, the governor of Aleppo. A path leads from the lower part of the castle on the side of the river to a building known as the "Pigeon Castle", which is positioned under an overhanging ledge of rock. It was used to provide water to the castle, as well as relaying it over a bridge to the Eski Kale. On the top floor is a room set up as a homing pigeon house, with a rectangular hole entry hole and 32 nesting niches. It was still being used for communications as late as the 13th century when the Sultan Qala'un was seeking information about the troop movements of the hostile Ilkhanate before the Second Battle of Homs.

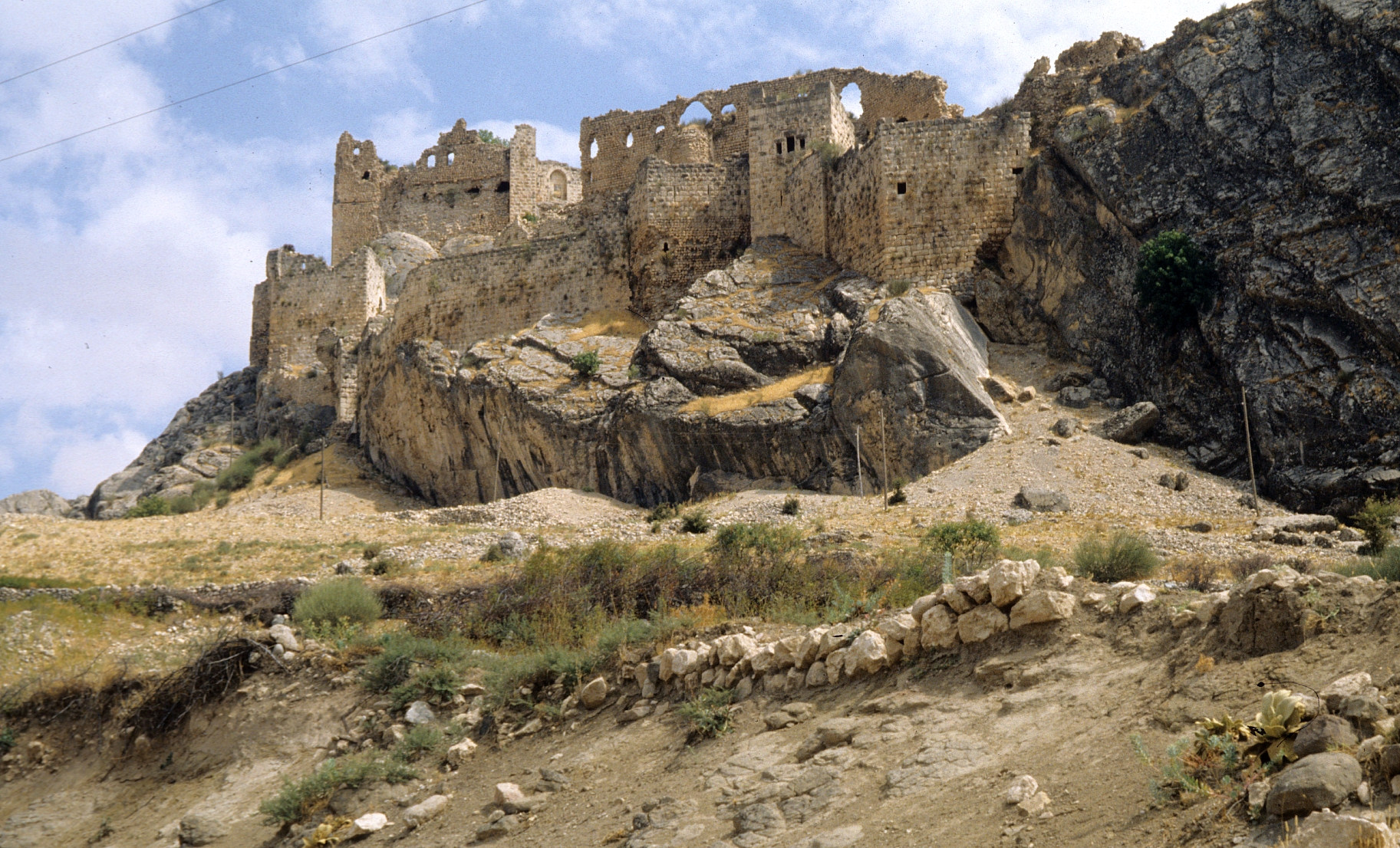
The Mameluke fort at Yenikale

== The Field of Iron ==
To the west of the two mountains of Yenikale and Eskikale Dörner and his colleague Wilhelm Winkelmann discovered an area of iron smelting, the first in Commagene. The remains of furnace walls, bits of slag, salamanders (the remains of pig iron left when smelting), as well as sharp pieces and coins.

== History of research ==
During the research at the site of Nemrut Dağı in 1951, Dörner's was brought to the "Picture Stone" by a local. After careful examination, it was identified as the relief representing Mithras from Site II. When he later found the inscriptional wall of Site III, which he could read straight away thanks to its excellent state of preservation, he was able to identify the site as the Commagenian royal seat of Arsameia. In 1953 he undertook first excavations. Along with the American Theresa Goell, he discovered and unearthed other finds that are visible today. From 1963, further excavations took place. Some of the finds are now exhibited in the Archaeological Museum of Gaziantep.

== Bibliography ==
- Dörner, Friedrich Karl; Goell, Theresa (1963). Arsameia am Nymphaios: Die Ausgrabungen im Hierothesion des Mithradates Kallinikos von 1953-1956 [Arsameia at Nymphaios: The excavations in the hierothesion of Mithradates Kallinikos from 1953-1956] (in German). Gebr. Mann. ISBN 3803017548.
- Dörner, Friedrich Karl (1987). Der Thron der Götter auf dem Nemrud Dağ [The Thrones of the Gods upon Nemrud Dağ] (in German) (2 ed.). Gustav Lübbe. ISBN 3-7857-0277-9.
- Waldmann, Helmut (1973). Die kommagenischen Kultreformen unter König Mithradates I. Kallinikos und seinem Sohne Antiochos I [The Commagenean cult reforms under King Mithradates I Kallinikos and his son Antiochus I] (in German). Leiden: Brill. ISBN 90-04-03657-1 – via GoogleBooks.
- Merkelbach, Reinhold (1994). Mithras: Ein Persisch-römischer Mysterienkult [Mithras: A romanized Perian mystery cult] (in German). Walter de Gruyter. ISBN 3895470457 – via GoogleBooks.

== Links ==
- Commagene in the Enzyclopedia Iranica
- Plan, history and pictures of Arsameia
