= Stephen J. Pyne =

American academic

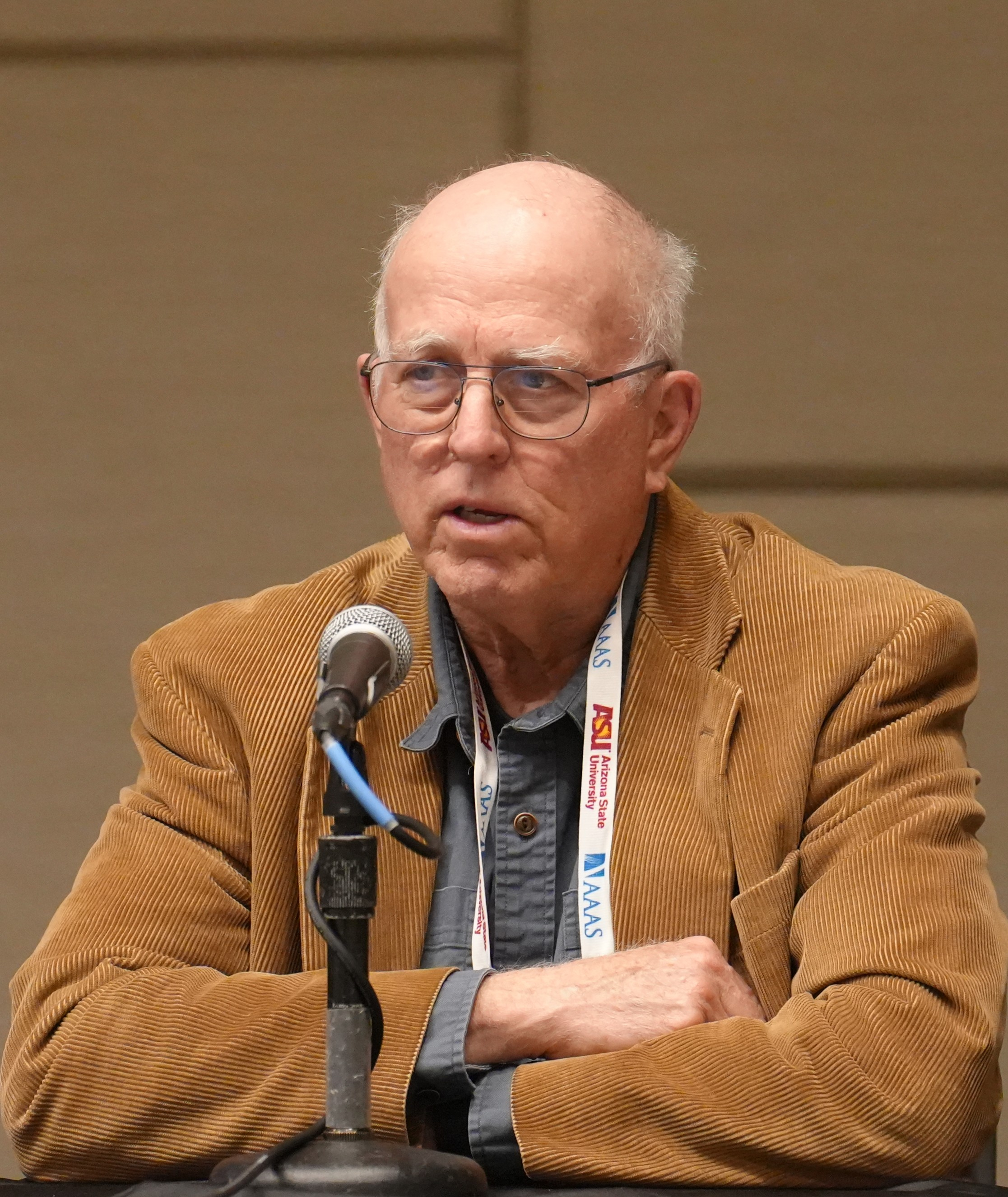
- Pyne in 2026
- Education: Stanford University; University of Texas at Austin
- Occupation: Emeritus professor
- Employer: Arizona State University
- Awards: MacArthur Fellows Program

Stephen J. Pyne (born 1949) is an emeritus professor at Arizona State University, specializing in environmental history, the history of exploration, and especially the history of humanity and fire.

== Education ==
Pyne attended a Jesuit high school in Phoenix, Arizona, received his bachelor's degree at Stanford University and his master's (1974) and Ph.D. degrees (1976) from the University of Texas at Austin.

He spent his summers from 1967 to 1981 as a wildland firefighter at the North Rim of Grand Canyon National Park, twelve as crew boss. During the summers of 1983–85 he wrote fire plans for Rocky Mountain and Yellowstone national parks. He regards his experience on the North Rim as the foundation for his career and the inspiration for almost all of his writings.

== Career and research ==
He began his career as an academic in 1982 when he was hired by the History Department at the University of Iowa. In 1985 he relocated to Arizona State University where he remained until he retired as a Regents Professor at the end of 2018.

During that time he enjoyed two tours at the National Humanities Center, a National Endowment for the Humanities (NEH) Fellowship, a summer Fulbright Fellowship to Sweden, and an Antarctic Fellowship co-sponsored by NEH and the National Science Foundation, in which he spent a field season in Antarctica. In 1988 he was awarded a MacArthur Fellowship.

His research interests fall in two general categories. One, growing out of his years in graduate school, recount the history of exploration. These writings include his biography of G.K. Gilbert, The Ice, How the Canyon Became Grand, Voyager, and The Great Ages of Discovery. How Western Civilization Learned About a Wider World. Other works include The Last Lost World, which he wrote with his daughter, Lydia V. Pyne, and two books on writing nonfiction, Voice and Vision and Style and Story.

His second interest pertains to the mutual history of humanity and fire. Beginning with the 1982 publication of Fire in America, Pyne has expanded his study to include major fire histories for the United States, Australia, Canada, Europe (including Russia), Mexico, and the overall planet, along with shorter surveys of India, South Africa, New Zealand, Ghana, and other countries. He has written and co-authored three textbooks on landscape fires and their management. His 2015 book Between Two Fires and nine-volume series of regional fire reconnaissances,To the Last Smoke, update his earlier history of US fire, surveying events from 1960 to 2013. In 2026 he updated his fire history of Europe with "Undying Fire." He is frequently asked to provide historical and comparative context for current fire-related issues.

== Major concepts ==
Each of this two primary themes - exploration history and fire - has led to organizing concepts. For exploration this involves the notion of three great ages of discovery. The idea builds on the proposal by William H. Goetzmann, his doctoral supervisor, that the Great Age of Discovery by European explorers was followed by a "Second Great Age" begun in the mid-18th century. The first age aligned with a Renaissance; the second, with the Enlightenment, especially modern science. Goetzmann developed his concept in his book, New Lands, New Men. Pyne expanded the idea by arguing for a third great age that extended over the latter half of the 20th century in which exploration pushed into Antarctica, the deep oceans, and interplanetary space. He summarized his understanding in his book, The Great Ages of Discovery.

With regard to fire, Pyne has attempted to distill his extensive scholarship into one phrase and two organizing concepts. The phrase is, "We are uniquely fire creatures on a uniquely fire planet." The concepts are the "Pyrocene" and "third nature."

The Pyrocene argues that humanity's relationship with fire has become so powerful that it has broken the serial ice ages of the Pleistocene, that it has replaced an interglacial epoch with a fire age, what Pyne terms the Pyrocene. He regards the Holocene as an Anthropocene, or as viewed from a fire-centric perspective, a Pyrocene. A phase change involving fossil fuel combustion has accelerated the transformation.

"Third nature" builds on the ancient observation of Cicero (and others) that humans have remade raw nature into a facsimile or second nature. Pyne considers how fossil biomass from coal, oil, and gas have further restructured the planet. Some of that biomass serves as fuel to power humanity's ambitions, but much remains as matter in the form of asphalt, petrochemicals, synthetics, plastics, and so on that have interwoven with second nature to make a third nature. He has likened the process to "geology's Jurassic Park" because it has taken stuff from deep time and released into the present where it has become a serious pollutant. "It comes from another world," Pyne has said, "and doesn't belong in this one."

== Bibliography ==
Stephen J. Pyne has authored the following books, and his papers are housed in the Arizona State University Archives:

- Grove Karl Gilbert (University of Texas Press, 1980; University of Iowa Press reprint)
- Fire in America: A Cultural History of Wildland and Rural Fire (1982; paperback edition, University of Washington Press, 1997)
- Dutton's Point: A Natural History of the Grand Canyon (Grand Canyon Natural History Association, 1983; out of print)
- Introduction to Wildland Fire: Fire Management in the United States (New York: Wiley, 1984; out of print)
- The Ice: A Journey to Antarctica (1986; paperback edition, University of Washington Press, 1998)
- Wildland Fires and Nuclear Winters: Selected Reconstruction of Historic Large Fires. (Defense Documentation Center, DNA-TR-85-396, February 1986), 167 pp, illus, unclassified report to Defense Nuclear Agency. Co-author, Dr Philip N. Omi.
- Fire on the Rim. A Firefighter's Season at the Grand Canyon (1989; Bantam paperback edition, 1990; University of Washington Press paperback edition, 1995)
- Burning Bush. A Fire History of Australia (1991; paperback edition, University of Washington Press, 1998)
- World Fire. The Culture of Fire on Earth (Henry Holt and Co., 1995; paperback edition, University of Washington Press, 1997; Japanese edition, Hosei University Press, 2001)
- Introduction to Wildland Fire, 2nd ed. (New York: Wiley, 1996). Co-authors: Patricia Andrews and Richard Laven.
- How the Canyon Became Grand: A Short History (Viking, 1998; Penguin Books, pb edition, 1999)
- Vestal Fire. An Environmental History, Told Through Fire, of Europe and Europe's Encounter with the World (1997; paperback edition, University of Washington Press, 2000)
- Fire: A Brief History (University of Washington Press and British Museum, 2001)
- Year of the Fires: The Story of the Great Fires of 1910 (New York: Viking, 2001; Penguin, pb edition, 2002)
- Smokechasing (Tucson: University of Arizona Press, 2003)
- Tending Fire: Coping With America's Wildfires (Island Press, 2004)
- Brittlebush Valley (Patsons Press, 2005)
- The Still-Burning Bush (Scribe Publications, 2006)
- Awful Splendour: A Fire History of Canada (University of British Columbia Press, 2007)
- Voice and Vision: A Guide to Writing History and Other Serious Nonfiction (Harvard University Press, 2009)
- America's Fires. A Historical Context for Policy and Practice (Forest History Society, 2010)
- Voyager: seeking newer worlds in the third great age of discovery (Viking, 2010)
- The Last Lost World: Ice Ages, Human Origins, and the Invention of the Pleistocene (Viking Penguin, 2012). Co-author: Lydia V. Pyne.
- Fire: Nature and Culture (Reaktion Books, 2012)
- Fire on Earth: An Introduction (Wiley Blackwell, 2013). Co-authors: Andrew Scott, William Bond, David Bowman, M.E. Alexander
- Between Two Fires: A Fire History of Contemporary America (University of Arizona Press, 2015)
- To the Last Smoke Vol. 1 Florida, Vol. 2 California, Vol. 3 Northern Rockies, Vol. 4 Southwest, Vol. 5 Great Plains, Vol. 6 The Interior West, Vol. 7 The Northeast, Vol. 8 Slopovers: Oak Woodlands, Pacific Northwest, and Alaska, and Vol. 9 Here and There. (University of Arizona Press, 2016–2018)
- Style and Story. Literary Methods for Writing Nonfiction (University of Arizona Press, 2018)
- Fire: A Brief History, 2nd edition, rev. (University of Washington Press, August 2019)
- The Still-Burning Bush, rev. (Scribe Publications, 2020). Expanded and revised edition.
- The Great Ages of Discovery. How Western Civilization Learned about a Wider World (University of Arizona Press, 2021)
- The Pyrocene: How We Created an Age of Fire and What Happens Next (University of California Press, 2021)
- Wild Visions. Wilderness as Image and Idea. Co-author with Ben Minteer and Mark Klett (Yale University Press, 2022)
- Seis Vidas en Fuego. Seis Cuentos de México (Mexico: Editorial de Colegio de Postgraduados y Universidad Autónomo de Chapingo, 2022). Coordinator.
- Pyrocene Park. A Journey Through the Fire History of Yosemite (University of Arizona Press, 2023)
- Five Suns: A Fire History of Mexico (University of Arizona Press, 2024)
- "Undying Fire: A Fire History of Mexico" (University of Washington Press, 2026)

== See also ==
- Wildfire
