= Salamander (ship) =

Several vessels have been named Salamander for the Salamander:

- Salamander of Leith was a warship of the 16th-century Royal Scots Navy. She was a wedding present from Francis I of France to James V of Scotland.
- The British Royal Navy purchased HMS Shark on the stocks in 1775. She was launched in 1776, and in 1778 converted to a fireship and renamed HMS Salamander. The Navy sold her in 1783. She then became the mercantile Salamander. In the 1780s she was in the British Greenland whale fisheries. In 1791 she transported convicts to Australia. She then became a whaling ship in the British southern whale fishery for a number of years, before becoming a general transport and then a slave ship. In 1804 the French captured her, but the Royal Navy recaptured her and sent her into Barbados. Although she is last listed in 1811, she does not appear in Lloyd's List (LL) ship arrival and departure (SAD) data after 1804.
- Salamander (1806 ship) was launched at Blythe. She traded as a coaster on the west coast of England and then to the Baltic. She was wrecked on the Swedish coast in 1823.

== See also ==
- HMS Salamander – any one of eight vessels by that name
- SMS Salamander – any one of several ships of the Austrian, Prussian, and German navies
