= Maurice Channel =

Coordinates: 59°26′S 27°5′W

Maurice Channel is a strait 1.5 nautical miles (3 km) wide between Bellingshausen Island and Cook Island, in the South Sandwich Islands off Antarctica. In 1820, Fabian Gottlieb von Bellingshausen indirectly indicated the existence of the strait by describing Southern Thule as consisting of one high rock and three small islands. The strait was charted in 1930 by Discovery Investigations personnel on the Discovery II and named for Henry Gascoyne Maurice, a member of the Discovery Committee.
