= Salamander Point =

Salamander Point (59°25′S 27°5′W) is the northern point of Bellingshausen Island, South Sandwich Islands. This feature was named North Point during the survey of the island from RRS Discovery II in 1930, but the name was changed by United Kingdom Antarctic Place-Names Committee (UK-APC) in 1971 to avoid duplication. The new name is in association with nearby Basilisk Peak; Salamander is an animal mythically supposed to live in fire.
