= Cook Island, South Sandwich Islands =

Island in the Southern Thule group of the South Sandwich Islands

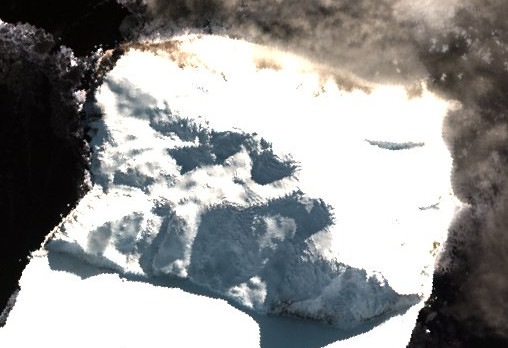
- Cook Island

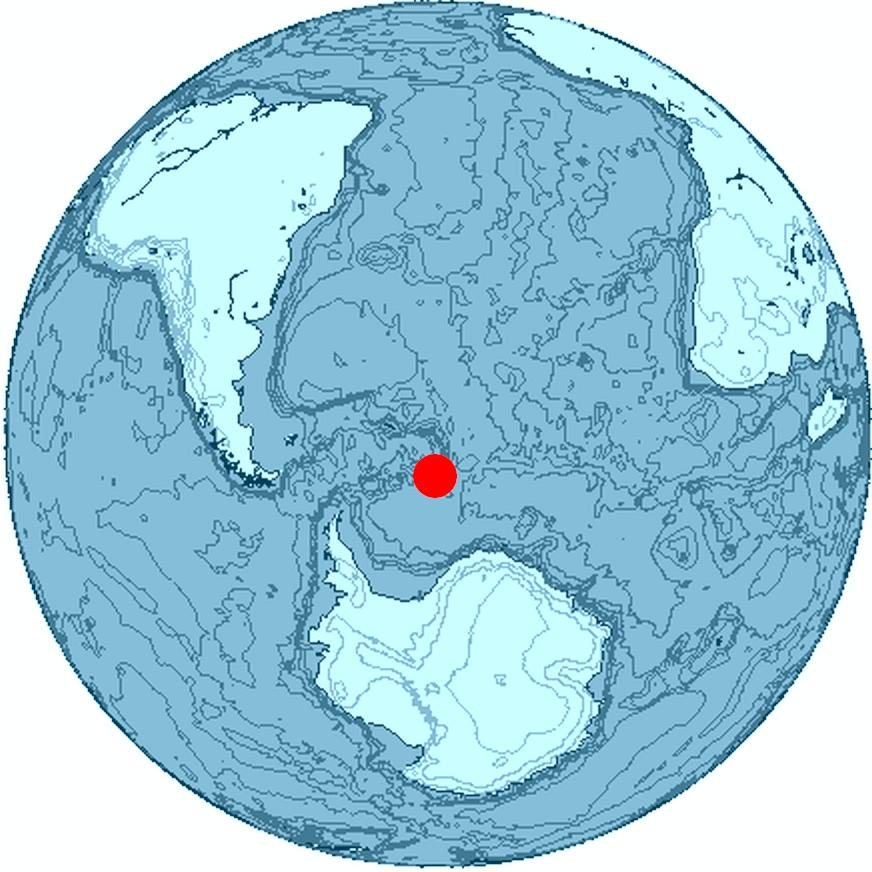
- Location of Cook Island

Geography
- Location: South Atlantic Ocean
- Coordinates: 59°27′S 027°10′W
- Archipelago: South Sandwich Islands
- Length: 6 km (3.7 mi)
- Width: 3 km (1.9 mi)
- Highest elevation: 1,115 m (3658 ft)
- Highest point: Mount Harmer

Administration
- United Kingdom

Demographics
- Population: Uninhabited

Cook Island is the central and largest island of the Southern Thule island group, part of the South Sandwich Islands in the far south Atlantic Ocean. Southern Thule was discovered by a British expedition under Captain James Cook in 1775. Cook Island was named for Cook by a Russian expedition under Fabian Gottlieb von Bellingshausen, which explored the South Sandwich islands in 1819–1820.

The island was surveyed in 1930 by Discovery Investigations (DI) personnel on Discovery II, who charted and named many of its features. Other names were later applied by the United Kingdom Antarctic Place-Names Committee (UK-APC).

== Geography ==
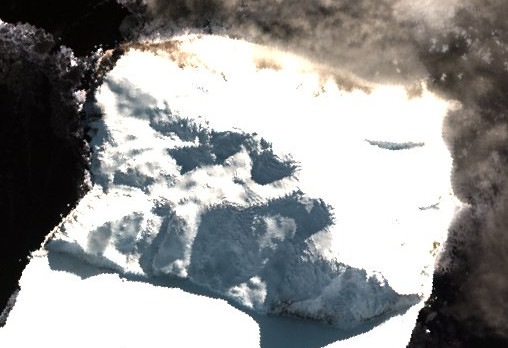
NASA Terra ASTER image of Cook Island.

Cook Island measures about 6 by 3 km (3.7 by 1.9 mi) wide. It is heavily glaciated and uninhabited. Its highest peak, Mount Harmer, rises to 1,115 m (3,658 ft). Mount Holdgate rises 960 ft (290 m) at the southeast end of the island.

Working clockwise from the northwest, the following points are found on the island's coast. All were named by DI personnel unless otherwise specified.

Resolution Point is a point on the northwest side of the island, named for Cook's vessel, HMS Resolution. Tilbrook Point is a conspicuous cliff forming the northwest point of Cook Island. Named by UK-APC for Peter J. Tilbrook, zoologist of the survey of the South Sandwich Islands from HMS Protector in 1964.

Reef Point is a point bounded by a small reef forming the west end of Cook Island, named descriptively.

Jeffries Point is on the central part of the south side of the island, named for Miss M. E. Jeffries, an assistant to the staff of the Discovery Committee.

Longton Point is a feature of sheer high rock cliffs alternating with steep icefalls, forming the southeast corner of the island. It was named by UK-APC for Royce E. Longton, botanist of the 1964 Protector survey. It is the southernmost piece of land of the South Sandwich Islands and the southernmost landmass worldwide north of the 60th parallel south and therefore the southernmost landmass outside of the Antarctic Treaty System. Swell Point is a small, narrow point on the island's east coast, near its southeast extremity, 1.2 nmi (2.2 km) south of Resolution Point. It was named descriptively.

=== Nearby islands ===
Cook Island is separated from Thule Island to the west by Douglas Strait, and from Bellingshausen Island to the east by Maurice Channel.

== See also ==
- List of Antarctic and sub-Antarctic islands
