= Pyrocene =

Proposed fire-centric era in geologic history

Pyrocene is a proposed term for a new geologic epoch or age characterized by the influence of human-caused fire activity on Earth. The concept focuses on the many ways humans have applied and removed fire from the Earth, including the burning of fossil fuels and the technologies that have enabled people to leverage their influence and become the dominant species on the planet. The Pyrocene offers a fire-centric perspective on human history that is an alternative to or complementary term for the Anthropocene. Like the Anthropocene, the concept suggests that human activity has shaped the Earth's geology and identifies fire as humanity's primary tool for shaping the planet and its environment.

Pyrocene was first proposed by environmental historian Stephen J. Pyne in 2015. Since that time, it has been adopted by journalists and scholars in the fields of wildland fire, ecology, and environmental policy focused on the impacts of climate change and increased risk of wildfires around the globe. This research has focused on extreme wildfires in Hawaii, California, Spain, Portugal, Romania, Australia, and Canada. It has relied on the concept of Pyrocene to highlight how climate change, land-use changes, and direct human ignition have increased the frequency and intensity of these conflagrations.

== Etymology ==
The word Pyrocene is formed from two Ancient Greek words. Pyros (Ancient Greek: πυρά, romanized: purá; from πῦρ (pûr) 'fire') is the Greek word for fire while "Cene" coming from the word kainós (καινός) means "new". The concept is that this epoch is "entirely new". The suffix '-cene' is used in several epochs of geologic Era.

== Overview of the concept ==
The concept of the Pyrocene argues that humanity's collective fire practices have become an informing presence and a geological force on Earth. Fire practices include all those activities that start and stop fires among living biomass, but also those that involve fossil biomass and those pyrotechnologies that enable people to leverage their influence.

The foundational premise suggests that humanity and fire formed an alliance that increased the range and power of each. While fire has been on Earth for over 420 million years, as long as terrestrial plants (Silurian-Devonian terrestrial revolution), humanity has altered its regimes and expanded it into a planetary presence. In return, fire has enabled and accompanied humans to every landscape on Earth and even the Moon. Humanity enjoys a species monopoly over fire's manipulation, establishing it as the keystone species for fire on Earth and making fire its unique ecological signature.

Together, humans and fire have upset biogeochemical cycles, including carbon, rewired energy flows, and, through the accumulation of emitted greenhouse gases into the atmosphere, perturbed global climate to such an extent that climate history has become a subnarrative of fire history.

According to Pyne's concept of the Pyrocene, there have been three kinds of fire. The first kind of fire was natural fire, which began with the evolution of plants. The second kind of fire was human fire, which the species domesticated for heat, light, cooking, and the control of landscapes. The third kind of fire involves extracting and burning fossil fuels through chemical combustion and industrial machinery. This third kind of fire has created by-products in the form of pollution and greenhouse gasses on a scale that have overwhelmed the atmosphere and the planet's capacity to cope with the accelerated rate with which humans burn these fuel sources.

== History of the concept ==
Fire historian Stephen Pyne first used the term in an article, "Fire Age," published by Aeon in 2015, then announced in the more fully developed form in 2019, again in Aeon. In 2019, Pyne used the concept to frame the September fire-focused issue of Natural History magazine and to provide a coda to a revision of Fire: A Brief History. In 2021 he condensed his notions into a small book,The Pyrocene: How We Created a Fire Age, and What Happens Next. The book was translated into Italian, Portuguese, Chinese, and Danish, and reviewed by both Nature and Science.

The Pyrocene has been frequently invoked in news articles about catastrophic wildfires in places like California, Hawaii, and Australia and the growing impact of wildfire smoke. Journalists in outlets including the New York Times, New York Magazine, Wired, and Los Angeles Times. The New Yorker has included it a review of recent books with a fire theme. An overview has appeared in Scientific American.

In his original conception, Pyne imagined the Pyrocene as coextensive with the Holocene (current geological epoch, beginning approximately 11,700 years ago), commencing as a fire-wielding species that interacted more widely with a fire-warming Earth. He introduced the term "pyric transition" to describe the subsequent phase change that occurred when humans began to burn fossil biomass (or what he calls "lithic landscapes") in place of surface biomass ("living landscapes"). Burning in living landscapes has a long evolutionary ecological checks and balances history. Burning fossil biomass lacks those baffles and barriers; the available sources overwhelm the sinks, unhinging air, seas, and terrestrial biotas. Both realms of combustion share an unbroken narrative of humanity's relationship to fire. Pyne has proposed the metaphor of a fire age – the fire-informed equivalent of an ice age to suggest the cumulative magnitude of these effects. The Pyrocene is thus a successor epoch to the Pleistocene.

== Interpretations ==
In the original conception of the term, Pyne advocated for a long Pyrocene that spans the entirety of the Holocene. He acknowledges, however, that the evidence and case for pre-industrial global change through anthropogenic fire is only recently emerging. Most commentators reserve the term for a shorter Pyrocene era that begins with humanity's use of fossil biomass, which changed the use of fire in quantity and kind. Others have modified the concept to refer to that still briefer era of accelerated fossil-fuel burning after World War II. Some consider it a feature best restricted to the 21st century with its eruption of serial conflagrations.

Wildlife ecologist Gavin Jones and others have defined the Pyrocene as "the modern, human-caused era of extreme fire characterized by greater negative impacts to society and ecosystems than in the past." This definition focuses on the more recent impact of human activity on fire regimes, including climate change and fire suppression activities. Jones has argued that fire is a key driver of evolution and situated his research in the framework of the Pyrocene to investigate how species are evolving in response to more frequent and intense wildfires.

Likewise, Australian fire researcher Hamish Clarke has situated the Pyrocene specifically within the recent era of extreme fires exacerbated by changing populations and land use patterns. Others have invoked Pyne's concept of the Pyrocene when discussing recent catastrophic wildfires but have interpreted it as a new era coming after the Holocene, and as an alternative concept to a short Anthropocene.

Interpretations that set the start of this era in the 21st century have suggested that the Earth has just begun to enter the Pyrocene and that the planet can escape an era defined by fire through actions such as the reduction of greenhouse gases in the atmosphere and changes to land use practices, including a selective restoration of a second fire.
