= Lydia V. Pyne =

American historian and science writer

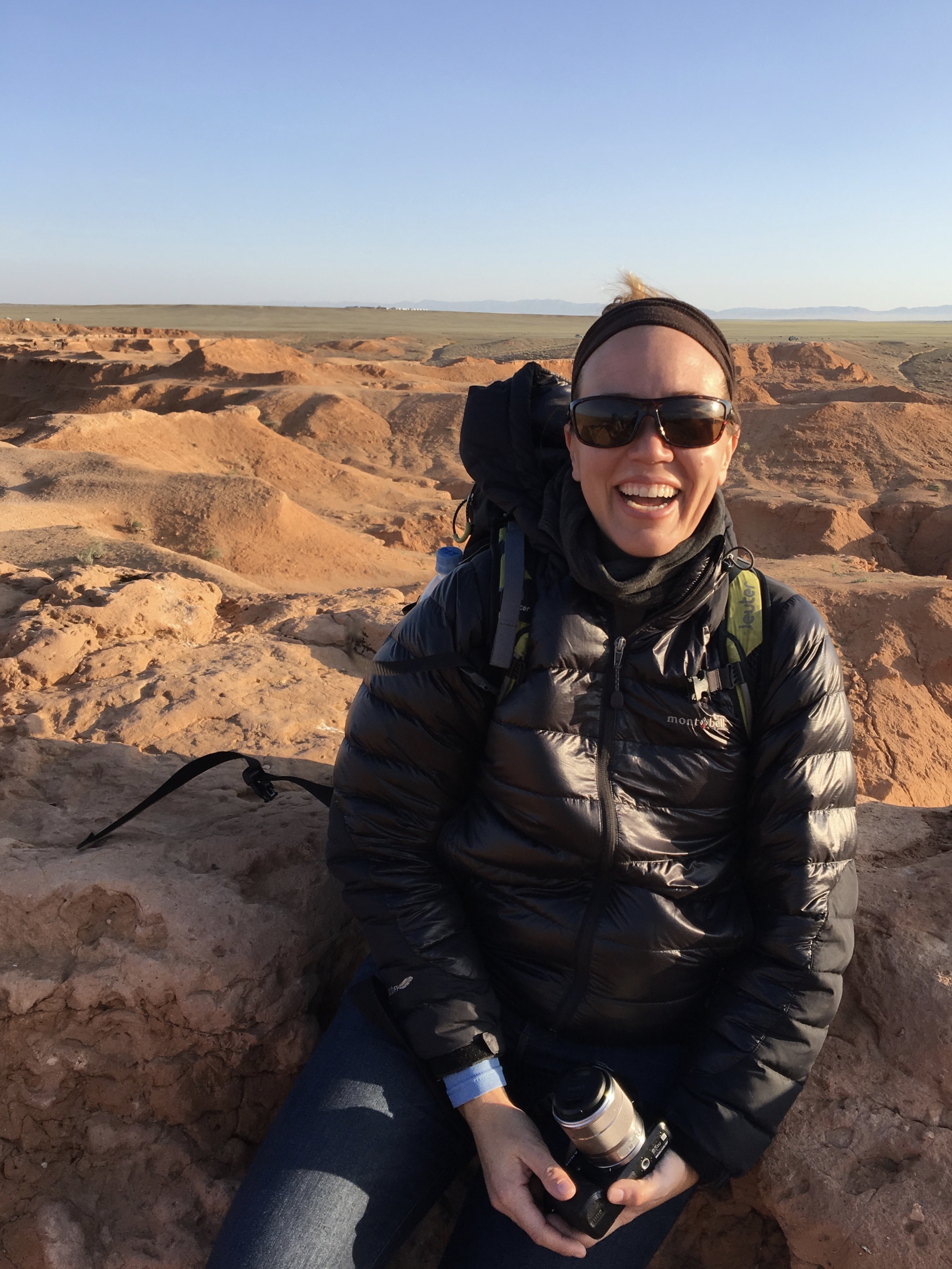
- Pyne at the Flaming Cliffs in 2017.
- Citizenship: United States
- Education: University of Texas; Arizona State University
- Occupations: Writer; Historian
- Parent: Stephen J. Pyne (father)
- Writing career
- Language: English
- Genres: History; Non-fiction
- Subject: Science
- Website: www.pynecone.org

Lydia V. Pyne is an American historian and science writer. She is a current visiting fellow at the Institute for Historical Studies at the University of Texas at Austin. Pyne and her work have been featured in National Geographic, Inside Higher Education, the Wall Street Journal, and on ABC, Science Friday, WHYY, KERA, Wisconsin Public Radio, and Talk Nerdy.

== Early life and education ==
Pyne credits her father, Stephen J. Pyne and her mother, Sonja, with encouraging her to pursue the sciences by being "curious about a lot of things". When she pursued higher education, Pyne was an English major. She ended up switching to anthropology and history, earning a double major in the subjects, both from Arizona State University. She earned her master's degree from the University of Texas, Austin in anthropology and biology at Arizona State. For her PhD, she started as an archaeology student and in the end, earned a degree in history and philosophy of science from Arizona State University.

== Career ==
Pyne's first book was The Last Lost World: Ice Ages, Human Origins, and the Invention of the Pleistocene was co-authored with her father, Stephen J. Pyne in 2012. That year, she served as a fellow at Pennoni Honors College at Drexel University.

Pyne's second book is Bookshelf, a history of the bookshelf, which was published in 2016 by Bloomsbury as part of their "Object Lessons" series. That same year, Viking Press published Pyne's Seven Skeletons: The Evolution of the World's Most Famous Human Fossils. Seven Skeletons presents the history of "celebrity fossils" including Lucy and La Chapelle-aux-Saints 1.

In 2019, Pyne's book Genuine Fakes: How Phony Things Teach Us About Real Stuff was published by Bloomsbury. The book examines the difference between artificial and "real" things, such as real diamonds versus lab grown diamonds.

Currently, Pyne is a visiting researcher at the Institute for Historical Studies at the University of Texas at Austin. Pyne is also a freelance writer. Her science and history writing has been published in Hyperallergic, the Pacific Standard and Archaeology.

Pyne's two most recent books were published in 2021 and 2022. Postcards: The Rise and Fall of the World's First Social Network was the first of these, published by Reaktion Books. In it, Pyne investigates postcards in order "to understand them as artifacts that are at the intersection of history, science, technology, art, and culture." Endlings, published in August 2022, is part of the Forerunners: Ideas First series from University of Minnesota Press. In this book, Pyne talks about how the stories we tell about endlings, or the last known individual of a species, draw from various narrative traditions and what those stories can tell us about grief and loss.

== Works ==
- with Stephen J. Pyne: The Last Lost World: Ice Ages, Human Origins, and the Invention of the Pleistocene. Viking. 2012. Pyne, Lydia; Pyne, Stephen J. (2013). pbk edition. Penguin. ISBN 978-0-14-312342-2.
- Bookshelf. Object Lessons (a book series about the hidden lives of ordinary things). Bloomsbury. 2016. Pyne, Lydia (2016). pbk edition. Bloomsbury Publishing USA. ISBN 978-1-5013-0732-4.
- Seven Skeletons: The Evolution of the World's Most Famous Human Fossils. Viking. 2016. ISBN 978-0-525-42985-2.
- Genuine Fakes: How Phony Things Teach Us About Real Stuff. Bloomsbury. 8 August 2019. ISBN 978-1-4729-6182-2.
- Postcards: The Rise and Fall of the World's First Social Network. Reaktion Books. 13 October 2021. ISBN 978-1789144857.
- Endlings: Fables for the Anthropocene. University of Minnesota Press. 16 August 2022. ISBN 978-1-5179-1483-7.

== Personal life ==
Pyne lives in Austin, Texas. She is an active member of the American Alpine Club.
