= Qaraqush =

Qaraqush (Arabic: قراقوش, from the Turkic for 'Black Bird') may refer to:

- Qaraqush, Iran, a Turkic-populated village in Iran
- Baha al-Din Qaraqush (died 1201), commander under Saladin, regent of Egypt
- Sharaf al-Din Qaraqush (died 1212), Ayyubid commander and adventurer in North Africa

== See also ==
- Karakuş
