= Pyrophobia =

Fear of fire

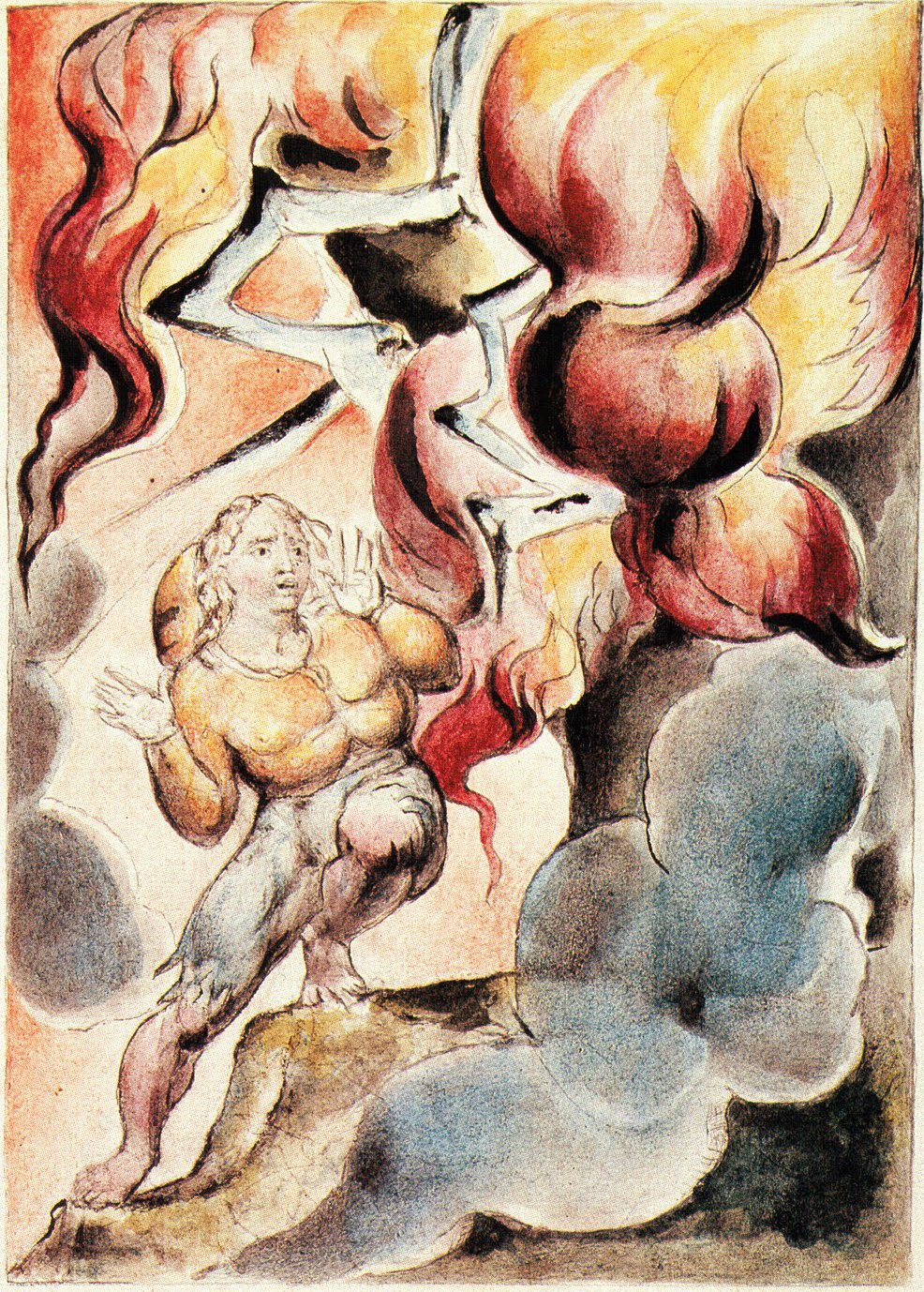
William Blake, Christian Fears the Fire from the Mountain

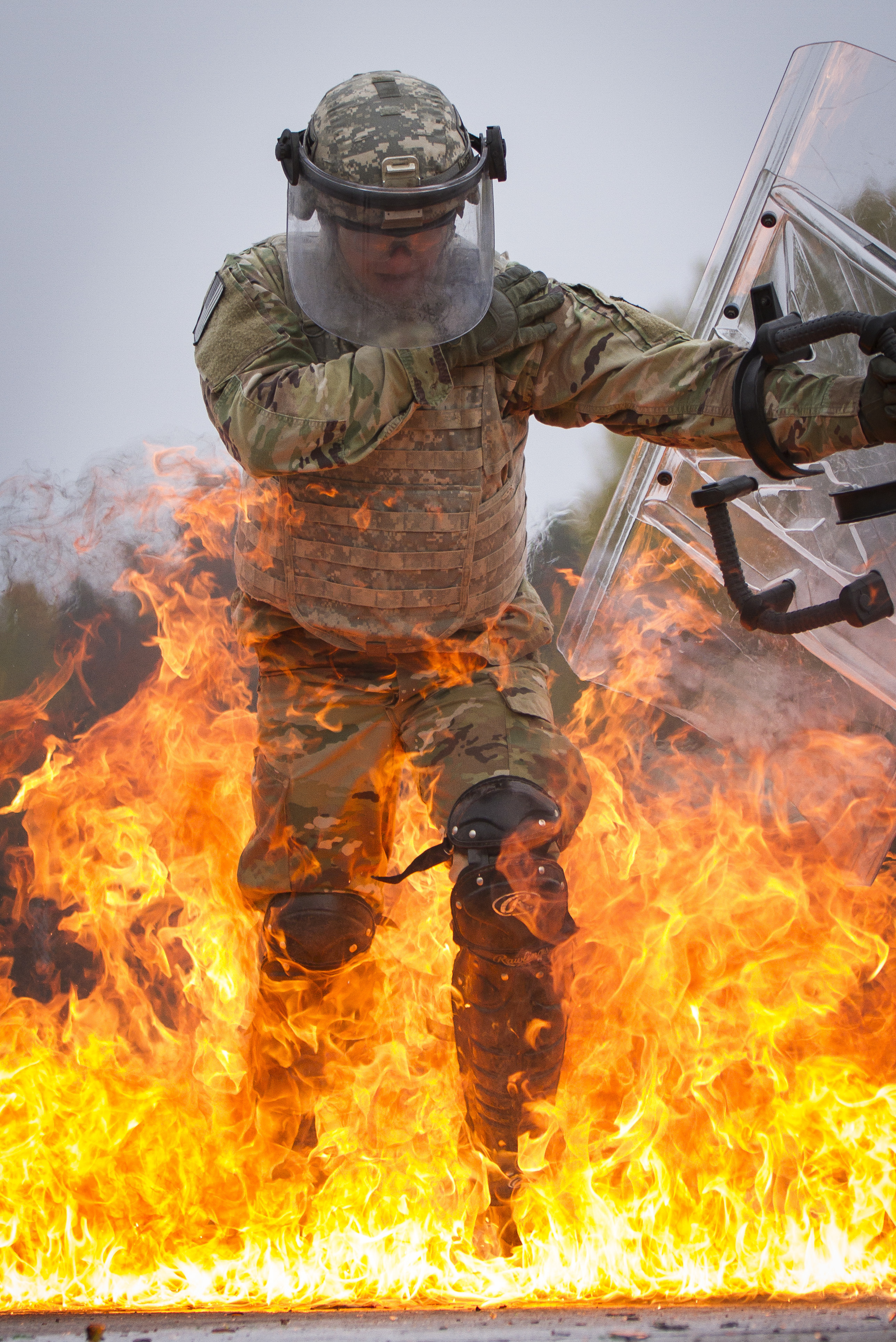
Training against fire phobia at the US Army

Pyrophobia is a fear of fire, which can be considered irrational if beyond what is considered normal. This phobia is ancient and primordial, perhaps since humanity's discovery of fire. Usually pertaining to humans' comprehensible reaction to fire itself, the fear of fire by other animals cannot be considered pyrophobic, as they are thought not to understand its purpose beyond general danger.

The term pyrophobia comes from the Ancient Greek word πῦρ (pûr) which means fire or flames and φόβος (phóbos) meaning fear or terror in Ancient Greek.

== Signs and symptoms ==
When witnessing fire or smoke (even if the fire poses no threat, such as a candle), suspecting a fire is nearby, or (in some cases) visualizing fires, pyrophobes exhibit typical psychological and physiological symptoms of fear and panic: acute stress, fast heartbeat, shortness of breath, tightness in chest, sweating, nausea, shaking or trembling, dry mouth, needing to go to the bathroom, dizziness and/or fainting. A pyrophobe may also attempt to avoid or flee from fires, and avoid situations where harmless fire may be present (such as a barbecue or a campfire). The severity of pyrophobia can range from inconvenient to disturbing a person's daily functioning.

== Causes ==
The most common cause of pyrophobia is that fire poses a potential threat to life safety (which is identical in animals). However, people who are intensely pyrophobic cannot even get close to or tolerate even a small controlled fire, such as fireplace, bonfire or lit candle. In many cases a bad childhood experience with fire may have triggered the condition.

== Treatment ==
Exposure therapy is the most common way to treat pyrophobia. This method involves showing patients fires in order of increasing size, from a lit cigarette up to a stove or grill flame.

Another method of treatment is talk therapy, in which a patient tells a therapist about the cause of this fear. This can calm the patient to make them less afraid of controlled fire.

People can relieve pyrophobia by interacting with other pyrophobes to share their experiences that caused fear. Alternatively, pyrophobia can be treated using hypnosis.

Medication can also be used to treat pyrophobic people, although since it has side effects, the method is not highly recommended.

== See also ==
- List of phobias
- Pyromania
