= Mount Harmer =

Mountain on Cook Island in the subantarctic

Coordinates: 59°26′S 27°9′W

Highest point
- Elevation: 1,115 m (3,658 ft)
- Prominence: 1,115 m (3,658 ft)
- Listing: Ribu

Mount Harmer () is an ice-covered peak, 1,115 metres (3,660 ft) high, in the north-central portion of Cook Island, in the South Sandwich Islands. It was charted in 1930 by Discovery Investigations personnel on the Discovery II, who named it for Sir Sidney F. Harmer, Vice-chairman of the Discovery Committee.
