= Fire =

Rapid and hot oxidation of a material

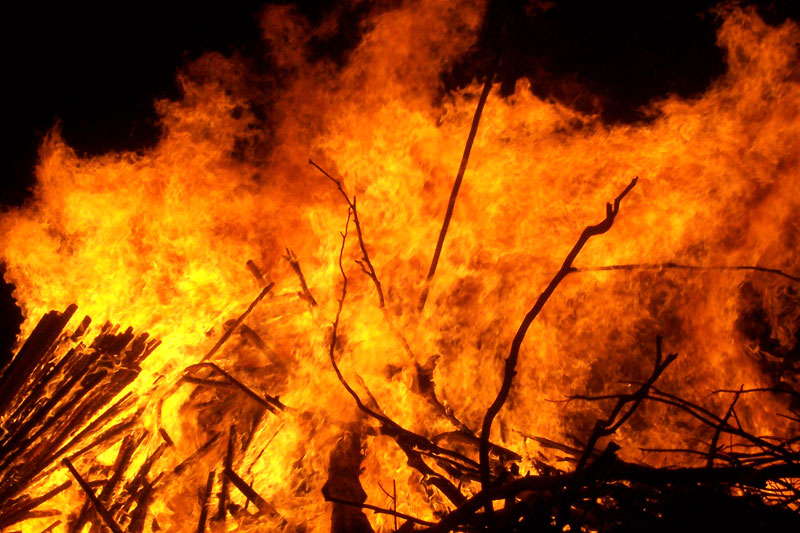
An outdoor wood fire

The ignition and extinguishing of a pile of wood shavings

Fire is the rapid oxidation of a fuel in the exothermic chemical process of combustion, releasing heat, light, and various reaction products. (Note: Slower oxidative processes like rusting or digestion are not included by this definition.) Flames, the most visible portion of the fire, are produced in the combustion reaction when the fuel reaches its ignition point temperature. Flames from hydrocarbon fuels consist primarily of carbon dioxide, water vapor, oxygen, and nitrogen. If hot enough, the gases may become ionized to produce plasma. The color and intensity of the flame depend on the type of fuel and composition of the surrounding gases.

Fire, in its most common form, has the potential to result in conflagration, which can lead to permanent physical damage. Fire directly affects land-based ecological systems worldwide. The benefits of fire include stimulating plant growth and maintaining ecological balance. Its harms include hazards to life and property, atmospheric pollution, and water contamination. When fire removes protective vegetation, heavy rainfall can cause soil erosion. The burning of vegetation releases nitrogen into the atmosphere, unlike other plant nutrients such as potassium and phosphorus, which remain in the ash and are quickly recycled into the soil. This loss of nitrogen produces a long-term reduction in the fertility of the soil. However, it can be recovered by nitrogen-fixing plants—some of them of agricultural value, such as clover, peas, and beans, by decomposition of animal waste and corpses, and by natural phenomena such as lightning.

Fire is one of the four classical elements and has been used throughout human history for purposes that now include cooking, generating heat and light, clearing land for agriculture, signaling, propulsion, smelting, forging, incineration of waste, cremation, rituals, weapons, and destruction, including in warfare.

Various technologies and strategies have been devised to prevent, manage, mitigate, and extinguish fires, with professional firefighters playing a leading role. For example, most home fires start from unattended cooking, although cigarettes are another major cause. Smoke detectors and sprinkler systems greatly reduce harm from home fires.

== Etymology ==
The word fire comes from Old English fȳr and has cognates in many Germanic languages and other Indo-European languages. The Proto-Germanic nominative form is reconstructed as *fōr, descending from Proto-Indo-European *péh_{2}wr. An alternative spelling existed in Middle English: fier; still preserved in fiery. The word ignite is derived from the classical Latin ignis meaning fire. The Greek term for fire, pyr, is used in words such as pyroclastic or pyrotechnic.

== History ==
=== Fossil record ===
The fossil record of fire first appears with the establishment of a land-based flora in the Middle Ordovician period, 470 million years ago. These land plants contributed large amounts of oxygen to the atmosphere when they released it as a waste product. When this concentration rose above 13%, it made a wildfire possible. Wildfire is first recorded in the Late Silurian fossil record, 420 million years ago, by fossils of charred plants. Apart from a controversial gap in the Late Devonian, charcoal is present ever since. The level of atmospheric oxygen is closely correlated with the amount of charcoal in the fossil record, clearly pointing to oxygen as the key factor in the prevalence of wildfire. Fire also became more abundant when grasses became the dominant component of many ecosystems, around 6 to 7 million years ago, providing excellent tinder for more rapid spread of fire. This widespread emergence of wildfire may have initiated a positive feedback process, whereby they produced a warmer, drier climate more conducive to fire.

=== Human control ===
The period of history characterized by the influence of human-caused fire activity on Earth has been dubbed the pyrocene. This epoch includes the burning of fossil fuels, especially for technological uses. Fire made it possible for humans to live in colder places and dark caves. It also protected humans against dangerous animals. It caused nutritional changes, and it enabled people to eat with more variety.

==== Early human control ====
Archaeological sites with early human fire use from the ROAD database (CC BY-SA 4.0 ROCEEH)

The ability to control fire was a dramatic change in the habits of early humans. Making fire to generate heat and light made it possible for people to cook food, simultaneously increasing the variety and availability of nutrients and reducing disease by killing pathogenic microorganisms in the food. The heat produced would also help people stay warm in cold weather, enabling them to live in cooler climates. Fire also kept nocturnal predators at bay.

Evidence of occasional cooked food is found from 1 million years ago, suggesting it was used in a controlled fashion. The oldest clear evidence of deliberate firemaking dates to around 400,000 years ago at the Hoxnian-aged Barnfield site in England, where pyrite appears to have been struck against flint to create fire. Evidence becomes widespread around 50 to 100 thousand years ago, suggesting regular use from this time; resistance to air pollution started to evolve in human populations at a similar point in time. The use of fire became progressively more sophisticated, as it was used to create charcoal and to control wildlife from tens of thousands of years ago.

Food being cooked in a cauldron above fire in South Africa.

By the Neolithic Revolution, during the introduction of grain-based agriculture, people all over the world used fire as a tool in landscape management. These fires were typically controlled burns or "cool fires", as opposed to uncontrolled "hot fires", which damage the soil. Hot fires destroy plants and animals and endanger communities. This is especially a problem in the forests of today where traditional burning is prevented to encourage the growth of timber crops. Cool fires are generally conducted in the spring and autumn. They clear undergrowth, burning up biomass that could trigger a hot fire should it get too dense. They provide a greater variety of environments, which encourages game and plant diversity. Humans make dense, impassable forests traversable.

Another human use of fire in landscape management is to clear land for agriculture. Slash-and-burn agriculture is still common across much of tropical Africa, Asia, and South America. For small farmers, controlled fires are a convenient way to clear overgrown areas and release nutrients from standing vegetation back into the soil. However, this useful strategy is also problematic. A growing population, forest fragmentation, and a warming climate are making the Earth's surface more prone to ever-larger escaped fires. These harm ecosystems and human infrastructure, cause health problems, and send spirals of carbon and soot into the atmosphere that may encourage even more warming – and thus feed back into more fires. Globally today, as much as 5 million square kilometres – an area more than half the size of the United States – burns in a given year.

==== Later human control ====
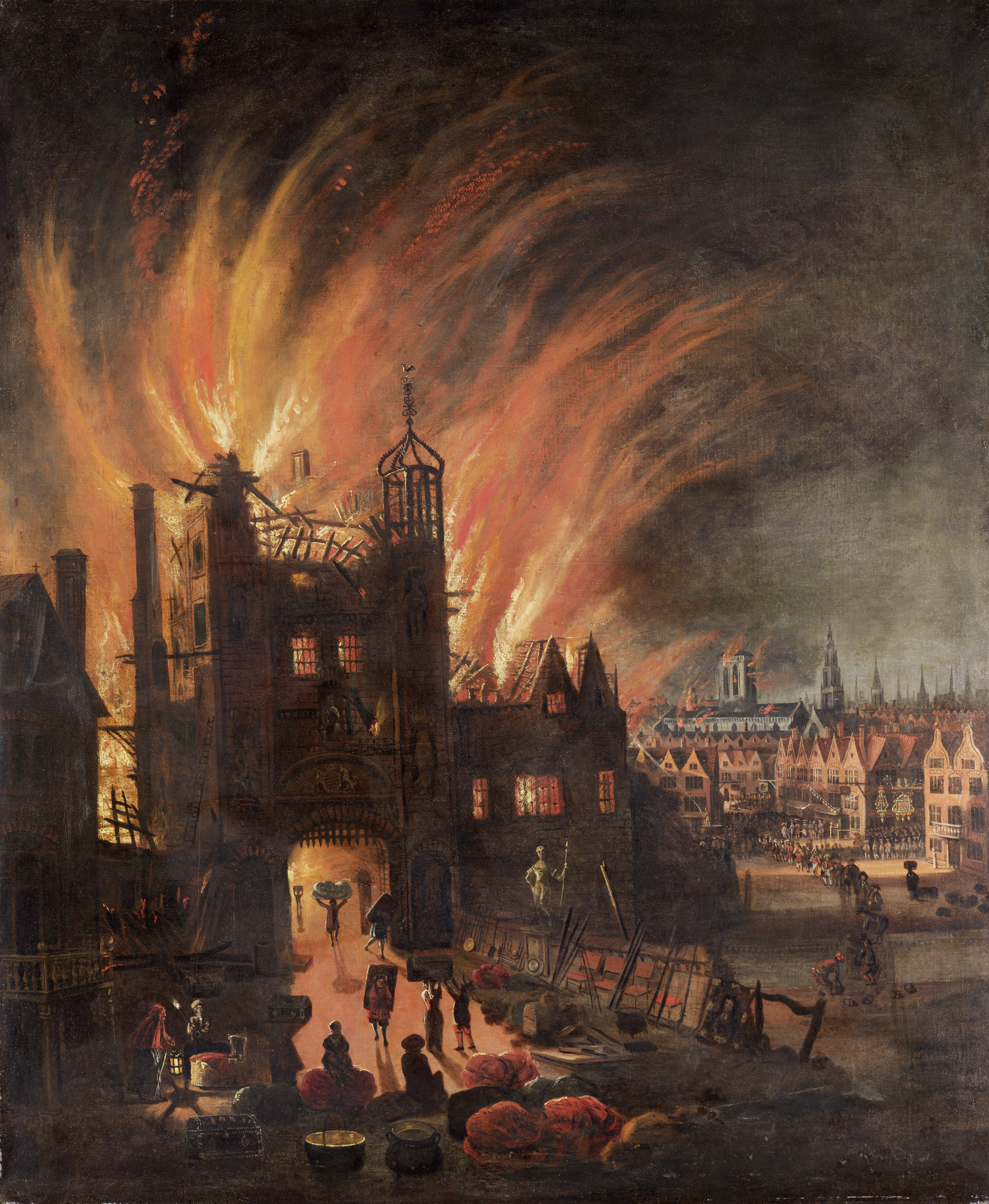
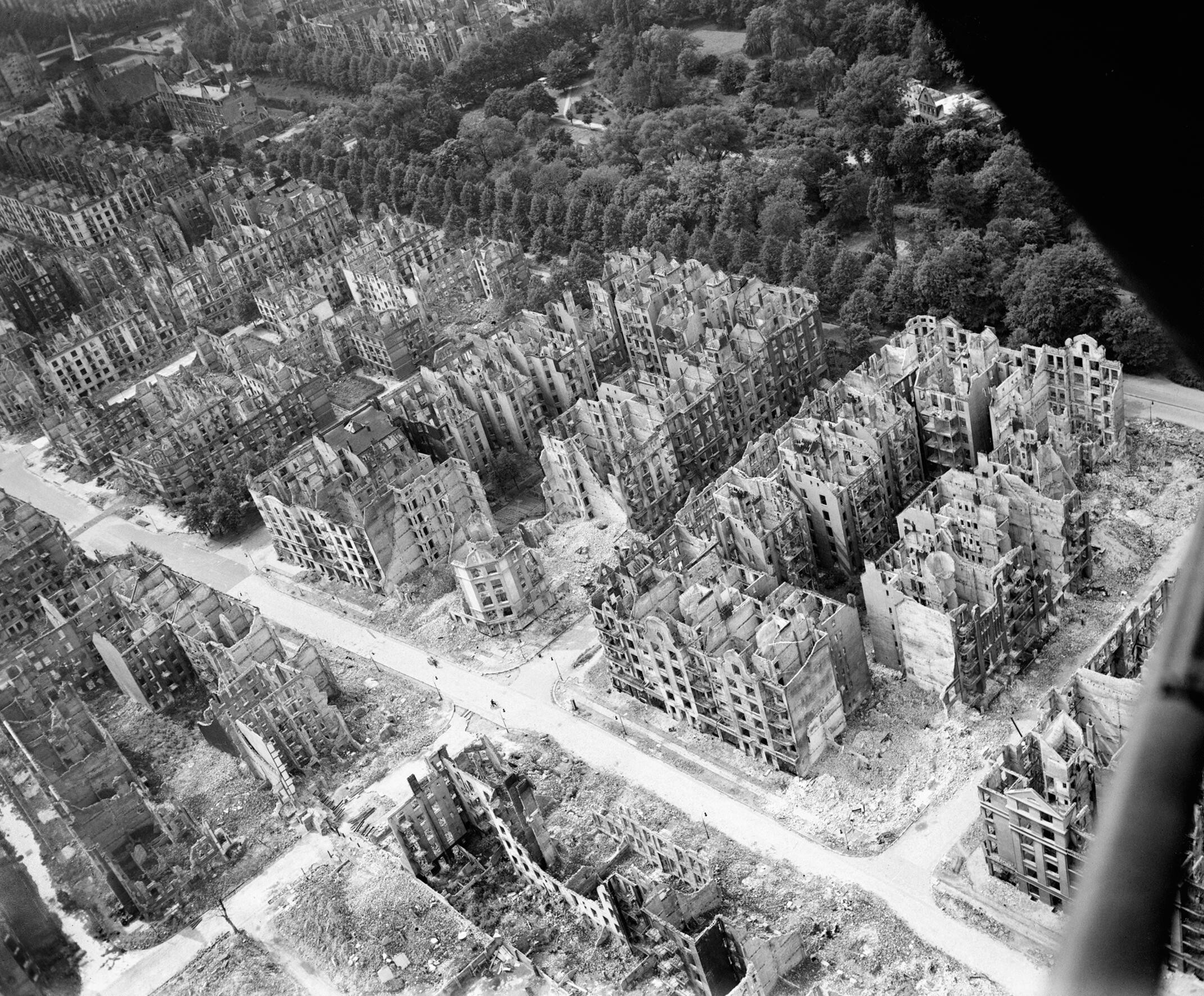
The Great Fire of London (1666) and Hamburg after four fire-bombing raids in July 1943, which killed an estimated 50,000 people

Throughout much of history, cultures attempted to explain nature and the properties of matter by proposing a set of four (or five) classical elements, of which fire was one of the components. As scientific understanding developed following the Middle Ages, this philosophy was replaced by a set of chemical elements and their interactions. Instead, the classical elements found an equivalency in the states of matter: solid, liquid, gas, and plasma.

During the 17th century, a study of combustion was made by Jan Baptist van Helmont who discovered that burning charcoal released a gas sylvestris, or wild spirit. This was subsequently incorporated into Phlogiston theory by Johann Joachim Becher in 1667 and more formally by Georg Ernst Stahl in 1697; a concept that would strongly influence alchemical thinking for nearly two centuries. It was Antoine Lavoisier who demonstrated that combustion did not involve the release of a substance, but rather something was being taken up. In 1777, Lavoisier proposed a new theory of combustion based on the reaction of a material with a component of air, which he termed oxygène. By 1791, Lavoisier's chemical concepts had been widely adopted by young scientists, and the Phlogiston theory had been rejected.

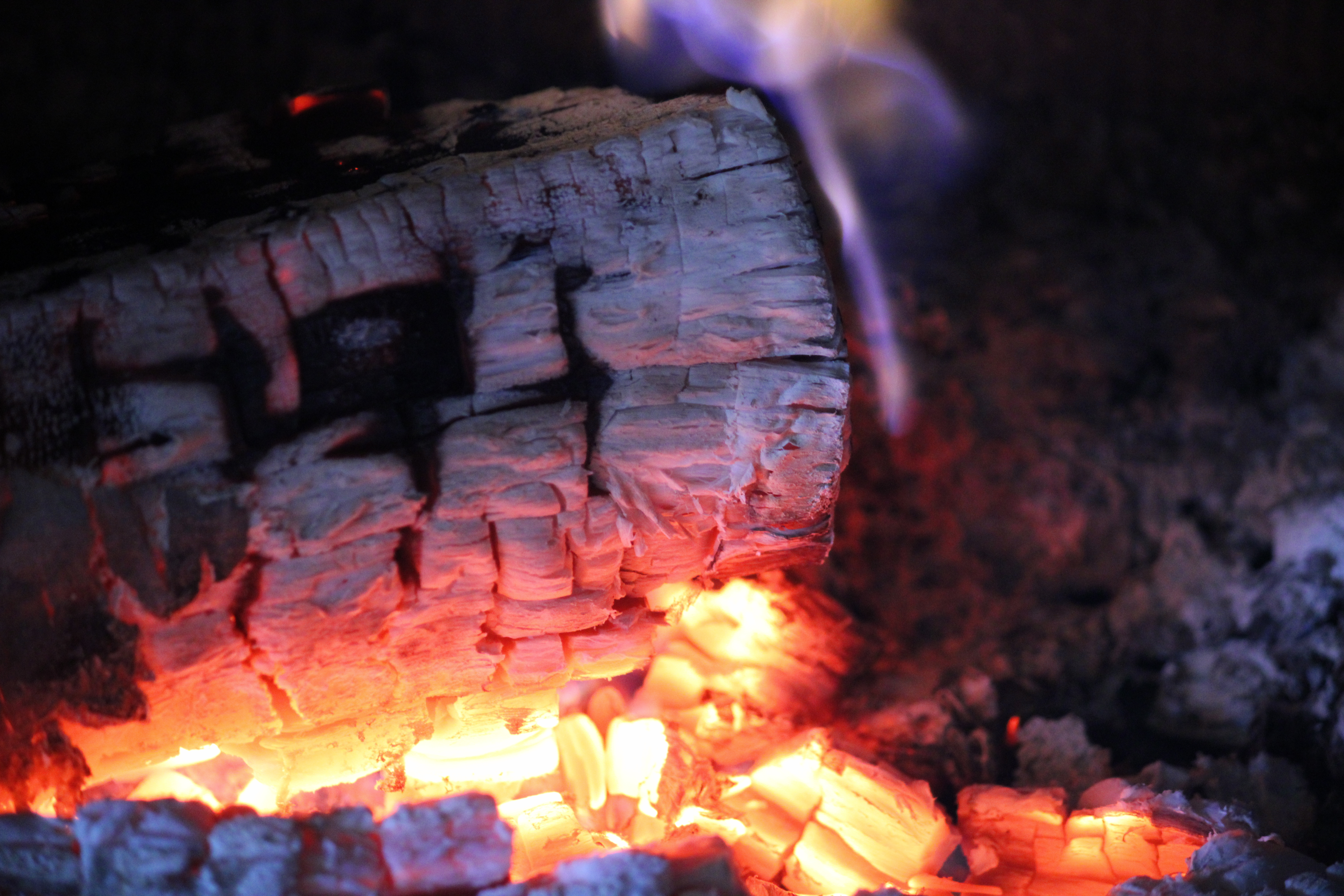
Firewood combusting into ash and coal in a wood-burning stove, 2025

Fire has been used for centuries as a method of torture and execution, as evidenced by death by burning as well as torture devices such as the iron boot, which could be heated over an open fire to the agony of the wearer.

There are numerous modern applications of fire. In its broadest sense, fire is used by nearly every human being on Earth in a controlled setting every day. Users of internal combustion vehicles employ fire every time they drive. Thermal power stations provide electricity for a large percentage of humanity by igniting fuels such as coal, oil or natural gas, then using the resultant heat to boil water into steam, which then drives turbines.

==== Use in war ====
The use of fire in warfare has a long history. Fire was the basis of all early thermal weapons, including incendiary devices, heated projectiles, and the use of smoke. This class of weapons was particularly evident during naval battles and siege warfare. The Byzantine fleet used Greek fire to attack ships and men.

The invention of gunpowder in China led to the fire lance, a flame-thrower dating to around 1000 CE, a precursor to projectile weapons driven by burning gunpowder. The earliest modern flamethrowers were used by infantry in the First World War, first used by German troops against entrenched French troops near Verdun in February 1915. They were later successfully mounted on armoured vehicles in the Second World War.

Hand-thrown incendiary bombs improvised from glass bottles, later known as Molotov cocktails, were deployed during the Spanish Civil War in the 1930s. During that war, incendiary bombs were deployed against Guernica by Fascist Italian and Nazi German air forces that had been created specifically to support Franco's Nationalists.

Incendiary bombs were dropped by Axis and Allies during the Second World War, notably on Coventry, Tokyo, Rotterdam, London, Hamburg and Dresden. In the latter two cases, firestorms were deliberately caused, in which a ring of fire surrounding each city was drawn inward by an updraft created by a central cluster of fires. The United States Army Air Force extensively used incendiaries against Japanese targets in the latter months of the war, devastating entire cities constructed primarily of wood and paper houses. The incendiary fluid napalm was used in July 1944, towards the end of the Second World War, although its use did not gain public attention until the Vietnam War.

==== Productive use for energy ====
A coal-fired power station in China

Burning fuel converts chemical energy into heat energy; wood has been used as fuel since prehistory. The International Energy Agency states that nearly 80% of the world's power has consistently come from fossil fuels such as petroleum, natural gas, and coal in the past decades. The fire in a power station is used to heat water, creating steam that drives turbines. The turbines then spin an electric generator to produce electricity. Fire is also used to provide mechanical work directly by thermal expansion, in both external and internal combustion engines.

The unburnable solid remains of a combustible material left after a fire is called clinker if its melting point is below the flame temperature, so that it fuses and then solidifies as it cools, and ash if its melting point is above the flame temperature.

== Physical properties ==
=== Chemistry ===
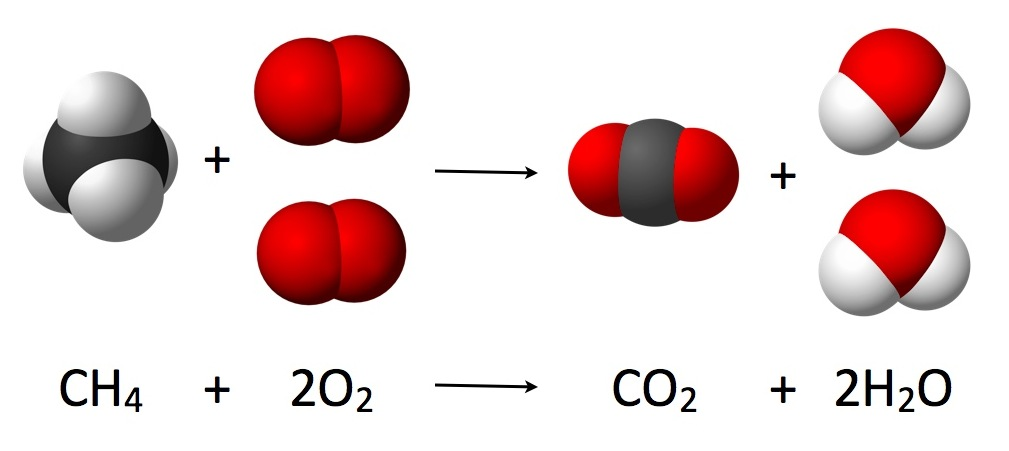
The balanced chemical equation for the combustion of methane, a hydrocarbon

Fire is a chemical process in which a fuel and an oxidizing agent react, yielding carbon dioxide and water. This process, known as a combustion reaction, does not proceed directly and involves intermediates. Although the oxidizing agent is typically oxygen, other compounds can fulfill the role. For instance, chlorine trifluoride is able to ignite sand.

Fires start when a flammable or a combustible material, in combination with a sufficient quantity of an oxidizer such as oxygen gas or another oxygen-rich compound (though non-oxygen oxidizers exist, such as chlorine), is exposed to a source of heat or ambient temperature above the flash point for the fuel/oxidizer mix, and can sustain a rate of rapid oxidation that produces a chain reaction. This is commonly called the fire tetrahedron. Fire cannot exist without all of these elements in place and in the right proportions. For example, a flammable liquid will start burning only if the fuel and oxygen are in the right proportions. Some fuel-oxygen mixes may require a catalyst, a substance that is not consumed, when added, in any chemical reaction during combustion, but which enables the reactants to combust more readily.

Once ignited, a chain reaction occurs whereby fires can sustain their own heat through the continued release of heat energy during combustion and may propagate, provided there is a continuous supply of an oxidizer and fuel. If the oxidizer is oxygen from the surrounding air, the presence of a force of gravity, or of some similar force caused by acceleration, is necessary to produce convection, which removes combustion products and brings a supply of oxygen to the fire. Without gravity, a fire rapidly surrounds itself with its own combustion products and non-oxidizing gases from the air, which exclude oxygen and extinguish the fire. Because of this, the risk of fire in a spacecraft is small when it is coasting in inertial flight. This does not apply if oxygen is supplied to the fire by some process other than thermal convection.

The fire tetrahedron

Fire can be extinguished by removing any one of the elements of the fire tetrahedron. Consider a natural gas flame, such as from a stove-top burner. Any of the following can extinguish the fire:

- turning off the gas supply, which removes the fuel source;
- covering the flame completely, which smothers the flame as the combustion both uses the available oxidizer (the oxygen in the air) and displaces it from the area around the flame with CO_{2};
- application of an inert gas such as carbon dioxide, smothering the flame by displacing the available oxidizer;
- application of water, which removes heat from the fire faster than the fire can produce it (similarly, blowing hard on a flame will displace the heat of the currently burning gas from its fuel source, to the same end); or
- application of a retardant chemical such as Halon (largely banned in some countries as of 2023) to the flame, which retards the chemical reaction itself until the rate of combustion is too slow to maintain the chain reaction.

In contrast, fire is intensified by increasing the overall combustion rate. Methods to do this include balancing the input of fuel and oxidizer to stoichiometric proportions, increasing fuel and oxidizer input in this balanced mix, increasing the ambient temperature so the fire's own heat is better able to sustain combustion, or providing a catalyst, a non-reactant medium in which the fuel and oxidizer can more readily react.

=== Flame ===
A candle's flame

A diffusion flame is a mixture of reacting gases and solids emitting visible, infrared, and sometimes ultraviolet light, the frequency spectrum of which depends on the chemical composition of the burning material and intermediate reaction products. During the burning of hydrocarbons, for example wood, or the incomplete combustion of gas, incandescent solid particles called soot produce the familiar red-orange glow of "fire". This light has a continuous spectrum. Complete combustion of gas has a dim blue color due to the emission of single-wavelength radiation from various electron transitions in the excited molecules formed in the flame.

Usually oxygen is involved, but hydrogen burning in chlorine also produces a flame, producing hydrogen chloride (HCl). Other possible combinations producing flames, amongst many, are fluorine with hydrogen, and hydrazine with dinitrogen tetroxide. Hydrogen and hydrazine/UDMH flames are similarly pale blue, while burning boron and its compounds, evaluated in mid-20th century as a high energy fuel for jet and rocket engines, emits intense green flame, leading to its informal nickname of "Green Dragon".

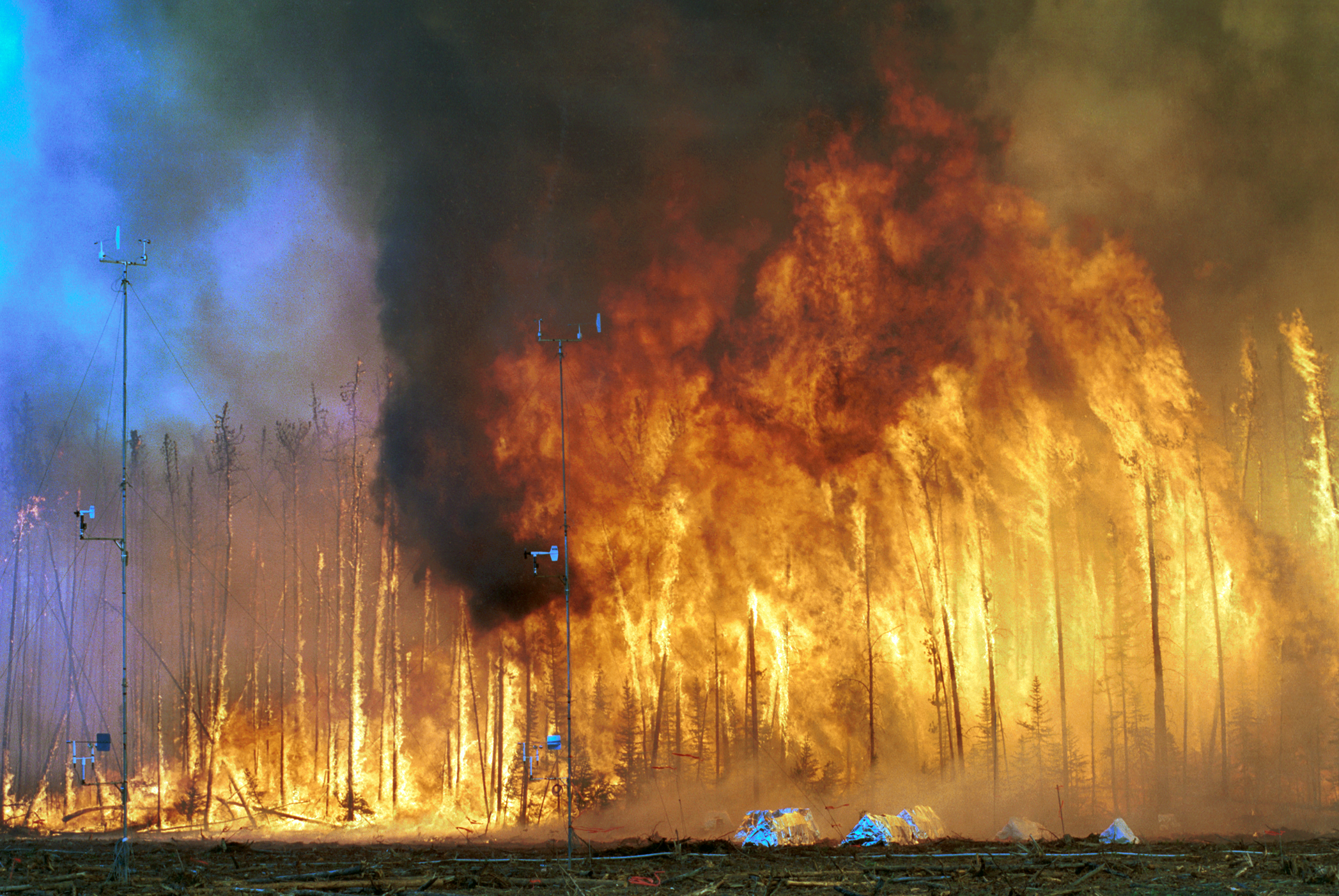
A controlled burn in the Northwest Territories, showing variations in the flame color due to temperature. The hottest parts near the ground appear yellowish-white, while the cooler upper parts appear red.

The glow of a flame is complex. Black-body radiation is emitted from soot, gas, and fuel particles, though the soot particles are too small to behave like perfect blackbodies. There is also photon emission by de-excited atoms and molecules in the gases. Much of the radiation is emitted in the visible and infrared bands. The color depends on temperature for the black-body radiation, and on chemical makeup for the emission spectra.

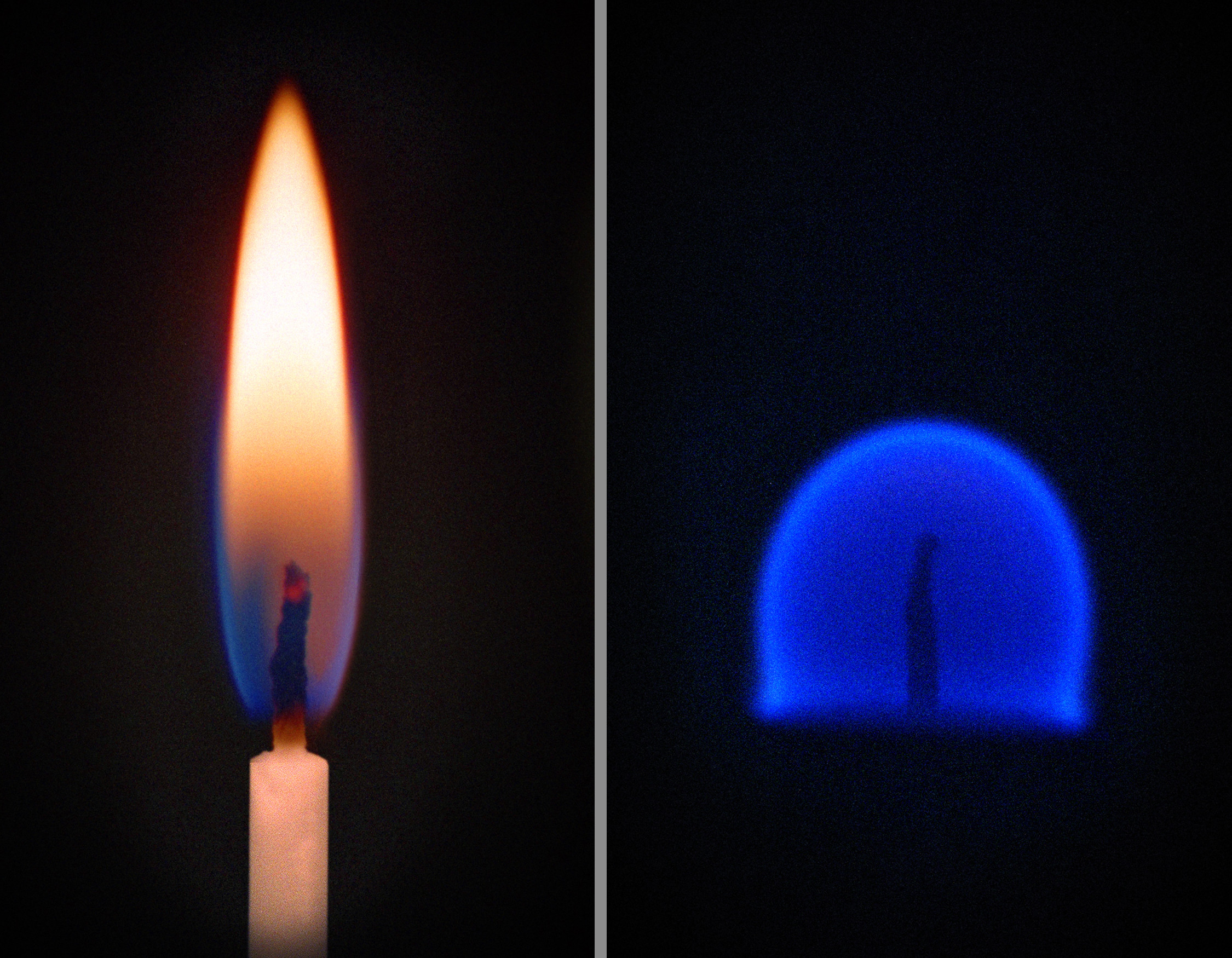
Fire is affected by gravity. Left: Flame on Earth; Right: Flame on the ISS

The common distribution of a flame under normal gravity conditions depends on convection, as soot tends to rise to the top of a general flame, as in a candle in normal gravity conditions, making it yellow. In microgravity or zero gravity, such as an environment in outer space, convection no longer occurs, and the flame becomes spherical, with a tendency to become more blue and more efficient (although it may go out if not moved steadily, as the CO_{2} from combustion does not disperse as readily in microgravity, and tends to smother the flame). There are several possible explanations for this difference, the most likely being that the temperature is sufficiently uniform that soot does not form and complete combustion occurs.

Experiments by NASA reveal that diffusion flames in microgravity allow more soot to be completely oxidized after they are produced than diffusion flames on Earth, because of a series of mechanisms that behave differently in micro gravity when compared to normal gravity conditions. These discoveries have potential applications in applied science and industry, especially concerning fuel efficiency.

==== Typical adiabatic temperatures ====
The adiabatic flame temperature of a given fuel-oxidizer pair is the temperature at which the gases achieve stable combustion.

- Oxy–dicyanoacetylene 4,990 °C (9,000 °F)
- Oxy–acetylene 3,997 °C (7,200 °F)
- Oxyhydrogen 3,473 °C (6,300 °F)
- Air–acetylene 2,500 °C (4,500 °F)
- Blowtorch (air–MAPP gas) 2,020 °C (3,700 °F)
- Bunsen burner (air–natural gas) 1,300 to 1,600 °C (2,400 to 2,900 °F)
- Candle (air–paraffin) 1,000 °C (1,800 °F)

== Fire science ==
Fire science is a branch of physical science which includes fire behavior, dynamics, and combustion. Applications of fire science include fire protection, fire investigation, and wildfire management.

=== Ecology ===
Every natural ecosystem on land has its own fire regime, and the organisms in those ecosystems are adapted to or dependent upon that fire regime. Fire creates a mosaic of different habitat patches, each at a different stage of succession. Different species of plants, animals, and microbes specialize in exploiting a particular stage, and by creating these different types of patches, fire allows a greater number of species to exist within a landscape. Changes in climate can significantly modify the risk for wildfires in a region.

=== Firefighting ===
Fire fighting services are provided in most developed areas to extinguish or contain uncontrolled fires. Trained firefighters use fire apparatus, water supply resources such as water mains and fire hydrants, or they might use A and B class foam depending on what is feeding the fire.

The early detection of a wildfire outbreak can be performed by a fire lookout observing from a tower constructed for that purpose. The use of these towers peaked in 1938 and has been in decline since then; most fire surveillance work is now performed using infrared sensors and aircraft. Fire suppression aircraft guided by a lookout can be used to help manage wildfires. These are primarily used in support of ground crews

=== Management, prevention and protection systems ===
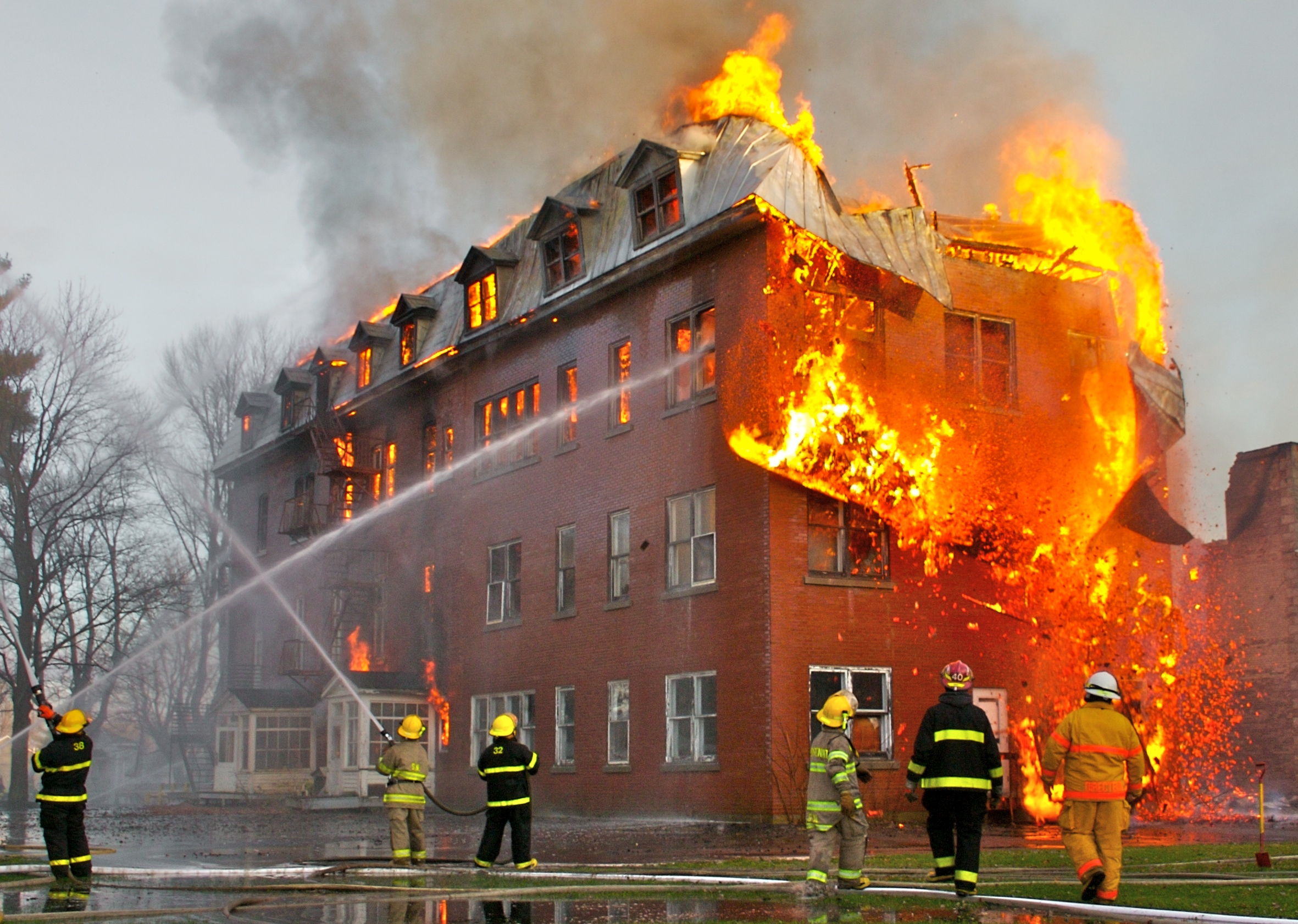
An abandoned convent on fire in Quebec

Controlling a fire to optimize its size, shape, and intensity is generally called fire management, and the more advanced forms of it, as traditionally (and sometimes still) practiced by skilled cooks, blacksmiths, ironmasters, and others, are highly skilled activities. They include knowledge of which fuel to burn; how to arrange the fuel; how to stoke the fire both in early phases and in maintenance phases; how to modulate the heat, flame, and smoke as suited to the desired application; how best to bank a fire to be revived later; how to choose, design, or modify stoves, fireplaces, bakery ovens, or industrial furnaces; and so on. Detailed expositions of fire management are available in various books on blacksmithing, skilled camping or military scouting, and domestic arts.

Wildfire prevention programs around the world may employ techniques such as wildland fire use and prescribed or controlled burns. Wildland fire use refers to any fire of natural causes that is monitored but allowed to burn. Controlled burns are fires ignited by government agencies under less dangerous weather conditions.

Fire prevention is intended to reduce sources of ignition. Fire prevention also includes education on how to avoid causing fires. Buildings, especially schools and tall buildings, often conduct fire drills to inform and prepare citizens on how to react to a building fire. Purposely starting destructive fires constitutes arson and is a crime in most jurisdictions.

Model building codes require passive fire protection and active fire protection systems to minimize damage resulting from a fire. A common form of active fire protection is fire sprinklers. To maximize passive fire protection of buildings, building materials and furnishings in most developed countries are tested for fire-resistance, combustibility and flammability. Upholstery, carpeting and plastics used in vehicles and vessels are also tested.

Studies have found that functioning smoke detectors reduce the risk of death in a fire by 50%, and sprinkler systems can reduce mortality by 100%. Fire-resistant clothing, beds, and sofas have also been shown to reduce injuries resulting from fires. In the United States, the leading cause of residential fires is cooking equipment, particularly cooking left unattended. It is estimated that cigarettes and other smoking materials are responsible for about 28% of home fires involving the ignition of upholstered furniture, and for approximately 58% of the fatalities in such fires. Fires started by cigarettes are also more lethal and have higher mortality rates than fires that spread from open flames. The adoption of fire-safe cigarettes has been associated with a 45% reduction in fires caused by cigarettes.

Where fire prevention and fire protection have failed to prevent damage, fire insurance can mitigate the financial impact.

== In culture ==
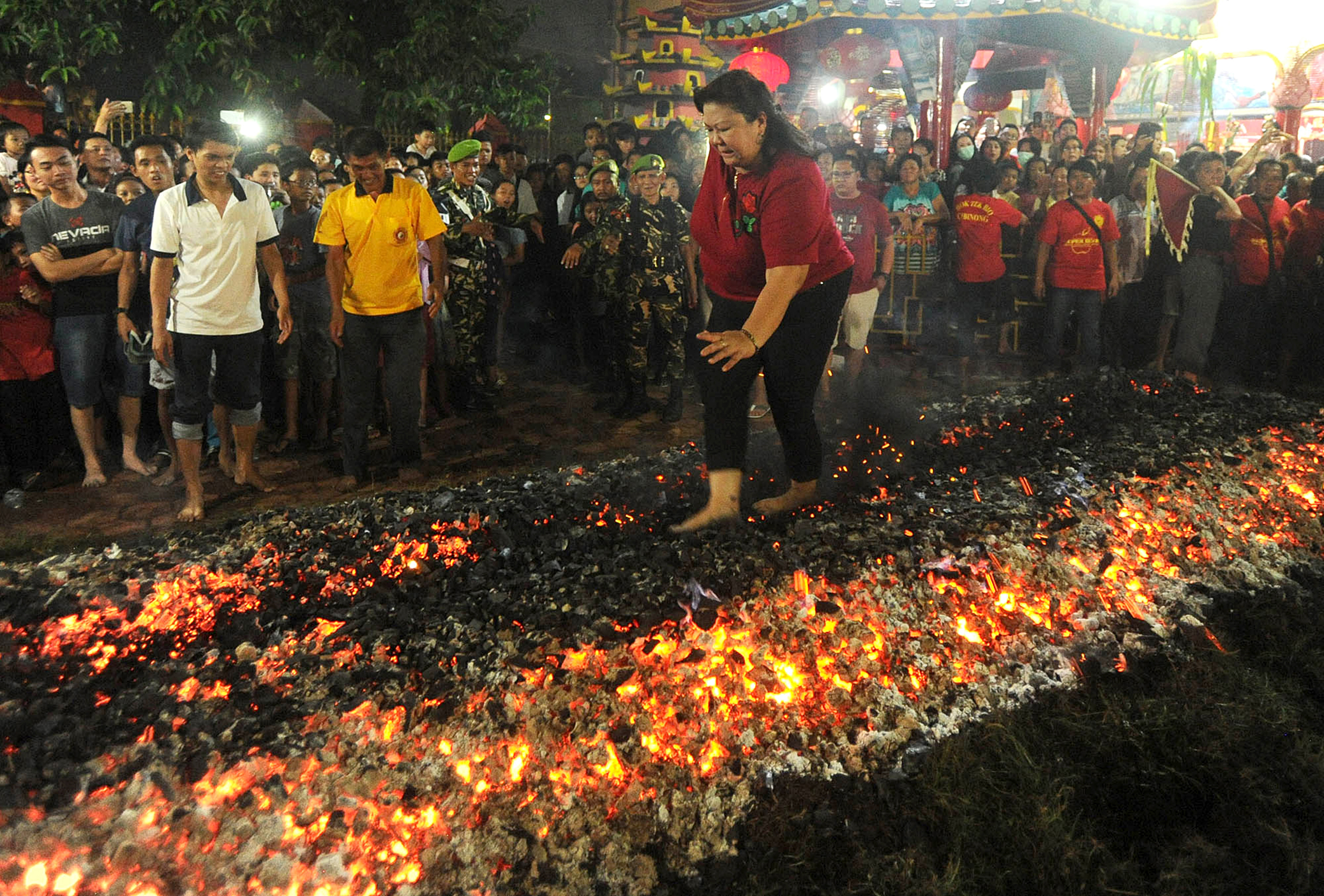
A firewalking ceremony

Fire has been an importance aspect of human culture since the Lower Paleolithic. Archaeological evidence demonstrates that fire worship has been widely practiced since prehistory, with dedicated structures found dating from at least the Chalcolithic period. The religion of Zoroastrianism is closely linked to this practice. In some societies fire was a deity, while others viewed it as the manifestation of the divine. The fire in a hearth was perceived as symbolic of the Heavenly Fire, and thus is considered a sacred component by fire-worshipping cultures. The origin of fire became a subject of mythology. In ancient Greek culture, the Titan god Prometheus was responsible for stealing heavenly fire and giving it to humanity.

The use of a pyre as a funerary practice dates back to at least the Ancient Roman period in the West, and to about 4,000 years ago on the Indian subcontinent. Cremation of corpses is a tradition long practiced in some cultures, including Hindu. After early religious resistance in some countries, in the 19th century this practice became more widespread and is now commonplace. In some nations, suicide by self-immolation remains common.

The symbology of fire remains important to the present day. Where wood is plentiful, the bonfire can be used for celebration purposes, in many cases as part of a tradition. An example is Guy Fawkes Night in England. The barbecue is a fire-based cultural tradition in the United States. The fiery ignition of fireworks has become a modern tradition to celebrate the New Year's arrival. In contrast, book burning has been used as a form of protest, whether for political, religious, or moral reasons. The act of "burning in effigy" has a similar role, as in the annual burning of Judas ritual.

Humans lack an instinctual fascination with fire, yet in modern societies, adults can become drawn to it out of curiosity. In societies that rely on daily fire use, children lose interest in fire around age 7 due to regular exposure. Arson is the act of intentionally setting fire to a property. A separate but related behavior is pyromania, which is classified as an impulse-control disorder where individuals repeatedly fail to resist impulses to start fires deliberately. In contrast is pyrophobia, an irrational fear of fire. This anxiety disorder is a less common phobia.

== See also ==
- The Chemical History of a Candle
- Colored fire
- Deflagration
- Fire making
- Fire pit
- Fire whirl
- Flame test
- Life Safety Code
- List of fire deities
- List of fires
- List of light sources
- Piano burning
- Pyrokinesis
- Pyrolysis
- Pyromania
- Pyrophobia
