= Awful Splendour =

2007 non-fiction book by Stephen J. Pyne

Awful Splendour: A Fire History of Canada
- Cover of original edition
- Author: Stephen J. Pyne
- Language: English
- Series: "Nature, history, society"
- Subject: Forest fires in Canada
- Publisher: UBC Press
- Publication date: 2007
- Publication place: Canada
- Pages: 549
- ISBN: 9780774813914
- OCLC: 145429214

Awful Splendour: A Fire History of Canada is a 2007 non-fiction book by American environmental historian Stephen J. Pyne. It examines the natural, social and political history of forest fires in Canada.

== Background ==
Author Pyne has a long relationship with forest fires; the Arizona State University professor was a wildland firefighter on the North Rim of the Grand Canyon for fifteen years, as well as a member of the United Nations Wildfire Advisory Group. The book is part of a series on forest fires by Pyne. In his Circle of Fire series, he has covered forest fires in the U.S., Australia and on a global scale. The Canadian Forest Service encouraged Pyne to tackle the topic of Canadian forest fires. The phrase "awful splendour" was taken from a quote from early Canadian naturalist Henry Youle Hind, referring to the destructive beauty of prairie fires.

== Synopsis ==
The book is divided into three sections, titled "Torch", "Axe", and "Engine", roughly corresponding to the pre-contact, exploration, and industrial periods of Canadian history. In its frequent mentions of American experiences with fire, the book engages in some comparative history. Pyne defines several geographical "rings" of fire in Canada, including the boreal forests, the coastal forests of the Pacific and Atlantic, the mountain forests of British Columbia and Alberta, and the mixed wood forests of the Prairies, Ontario, and Quebec.

== Reception ==
Canadian Literature noted that the book "filled a gaping hole" in Canadian scholarly writing on forest fires, and credited Pyne for accessing "grey literature" in hard to find locations. Reviewer David Brownstein called the book a "marvellously encyclopedic synthesis of a vast secondary literature on a complex topic." Reviewed in BC Studies, Philip Van Huizen praised the "elegant and evocative" writing of the author, as well as his use of narrative. The reviewer critiqued some of Pyne's organisational choices; by looking at fire management province-by-province, the third section of the book has some redundancies and can be "a chore to read (at least in places)." In all, Van Huizen called the work a "formidable and impressive book".
