= Bellingshausen Island =

Island in the Southern Thule group of the South Sandwich Islands

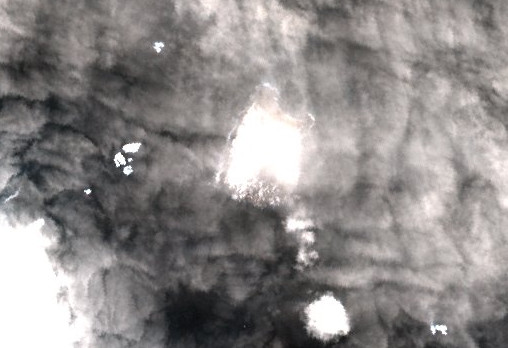
- Satellite image of Bellingshausen Island

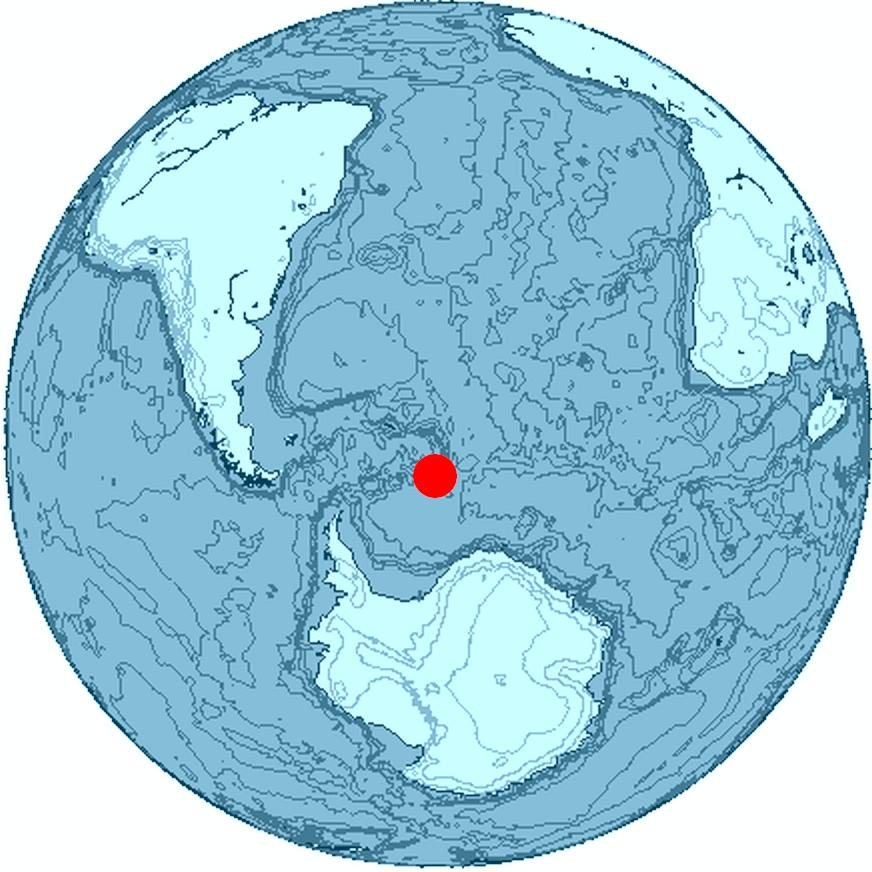
- Location of Bellingshausen Island within the Southern Thule group

Geography
- Location: South Atlantic Ocean
- Coordinates: 59°25′S 27°5′W
- Archipelago: South Sandwich Islands (Southern Thule)
- Area: 2.0 km^{2} (0.77 sq mi)
- Length: 1.7 km (1.06 mi)
- Width: 1.2 km (0.75 mi)
- Highest elevation: 255 m (837 ft)
- Highest point: Basilisk Peak

Administration
- United Kingdom
- Territory: South Georgia and the South Sandwich Islands

Demographics
- Population: Uninhabited

Bellingshausen Island is a small, uninhabited volcanic island in the Southern Thule group of the South Sandwich Islands, in the South Atlantic Ocean. It lies approximately 7.6 kilometres (4.7 mi) northeast of Cook Island and 16 kilometres (9.9 mi) east of Thule Island. The island is a youthful stratovolcano composed of basaltic andesite, rising to 255 metres (837 ft) at Basilisk Peak. Its most recent crater, approximately 150 metres (490 ft) wide and 60 metres (200 ft) deep, formed during an explosive eruption between 1968 and 1984.

The island was first sighted by James Cook's expedition in 1775, but was not distinguished as a separate island until the First Russian Antarctic Expedition of 1819–1821, led by Fabian Gottlieb von Bellingshausen, after whom it is named. The island was more accurately charted in 1930 by the Discovery Investigations team aboard RRS Discovery II.

Bellingshausen Island is part of the British Overseas Territory of South Georgia and the South Sandwich Islands and is also claimed by Argentina as part of Tierra del Fuego. The island is uninhabited and rarely visited, with no permanent infrastructure.

== Geography ==
Bellingshausen Island is situated at 59°25′S 27°05′W, in the southernmost part of the South Sandwich Islands arc. It is the easternmost and smallest of the three main islands of the Southern Thule group. The island measures approximately 1.7 kilometres (1.1 mi) in length and 1.2 kilometres (0.75 mi) in width, with a total area of about 2.0 square kilometres (0.77 sq mi).

The island is dominated by a central volcanic cone that rises steeply on all sides toward Basilisk Peak (255 metres (837 ft)). The summit contains a broad crater approximately 400 metres (1,300 ft) in diameter, with hydrothermally altered clay substrates on its walls and base. The southern flank features an extensive, well-preserved lava field composed of massive to bulbous basaltic andesite flows. The coastline is rugged, with steep cliffs up to 55 metres (180 ft) high in places, and occasional small beaches. The southeast extremity is known as Isaacson Point, named after S. M. Isaacson, an assistant to the staff of the Discovery Committee.

== Geology and volcanism ==
Bellingshausen Island is part of the South Sandwich volcanic arc, formed by the westward subduction of the South American Plate beneath the South Sandwich Plate. The island is a youthful stratovolcano composed primarily of basaltic andesite lavas and pyroclastic deposits, reflecting the calc-alkaline magma series typical of the arc.

The island exhibits persistent low-temperature fumarolic activity (90–100 °C) within the summit crater and along its eastern rim, emitting gases dominated by water vapor and carbon dioxide. A smaller parasitic explosion crater on the southern flank was formed by a phreatic eruption dated to 1975 ± 12 years. The most recent major eruption occurred between 1968 and 1984, producing the current summit crater and associated ash deposits. No confirmed eruptions have occurred since.

== Climate ==
Bellingshausen Island has a tundra climate (Köppen ET), characterized by persistently cold temperatures, strong winds, and frequent cloud cover. Summer temperatures average around 0 °C (32 °F) to 5 °C (41 °F), while winter lows drop below −10 °C (14 °F). Precipitation, primarily as snow, ranges from 500 to 1,000 millimetres (20 to 39 in) annually. The island is frequently shrouded in fog and exposed to gale-force winds exceeding 100 kilometres per hour (62 mph) due to its location in the path of Southern Ocean storm tracks.

== Ecology ==
Despite its harsh climate and active volcanism, Bellingshausen Island supports breeding colonies of several seabird species. Adélie penguins (Pygoscelis adeliae) are the most numerous, with an estimated 600 individuals observed during a 2020 survey. Chinstrap penguins (Pygoscelis antarcticus) also breed on the island. Other breeding seabirds include southern giant petrels (Macronectes giganteus), snow petrels (Pagodroma nivea), Cape petrels (Daption capense), Wilson's storm petrels (Oceanites oceanicus), black-bellied storm petrels (Fregetta tropica), and kelp gulls (Larus dominicanus).

Vegetation is sparse, limited to bryophytes such as mosses and lichens growing in areas influenced by geothermal heat. No vascular plants are present.

== History ==
=== Discovery and early exploration ===
The Southern Thule group was first sighted by Captain James Cook on 31 January 1775 during his second voyage, but he did not distinguish the individual islands. The islands were more accurately observed and charted by the First Russian Antarctic Expedition of 1819–1821, led by Fabian Gottlieb von Bellingshausen. The island was named in his honor by the UK Antarctic Place-Names Committee in 1971.

In 1930, personnel of the Discovery Investigations aboard RRS Discovery II conducted the first detailed surveys of the island, charting its coastline and naming features such as Isaacson Point.

=== Modern exploration ===
The first known landing on Bellingshausen Island was made by helicopter from HMS Protector in 1962 and again in 1964. Subsequent visits have been sporadic, primarily by scientific expeditions studying the island's volcanism and wildlife. In 1997, the British icebreaker HMS Endurance conducted geological and biological surveys in the archipelago. The island remains one of the least visited landmasses in the South Atlantic.

== Administration and geopolitics ==
Bellingshausen Island is administered by the United Kingdom as part of the British Overseas Territory of South Georgia and the South Sandwich Islands. Argentina also claims the island as part of its Tierra del Fuego province, but does not exercise effective control.

The island and its surrounding waters are part of the South Georgia and South Sandwich Islands Marine Protected Area, designated in 2012 and expanded in 2024. Access is strictly regulated and requires a permit from the GSGSSI.

== See also ==
- Hardy Point
- Salamander Point
- List of Antarctic and sub-Antarctic islands
