= Mount Holdgate =

Volcano on Cook Island in the subantarctic

Mount Holdgate (59°28′S 27°11′W) is a prominent mountain, 960 metres (3,150 ft) high, with steep icefalls and rock buttresses which provides a clear landmark at the southeast end of Cook Island in the South Sandwich Islands. It was named by the UK Antarctic Place-Names Committee for Martin W. Holdgate, organizer and senior scientist of the survey of the South Sandwich Islands from HMS Protector in 1964.
