= Basilisk Peak =

Mountain in the South Sandwich Islands

Highest point
- Elevation: 255 m (837 ft)

Geography
- Location: South Georgia and the South Sandwich Islands

Basilisk Peak (Spanish: Pico Basilisco) (59°25′S 27°5′W) is, at 255 metres (840 ft), the highest peak marking the crater rim of Bellingshausen Island, South Sandwich Islands. The name as applied by the UK Antarctic Place-Names Committee in 1971 "marks the aura of this savage cliff which falls abruptly into a deep and steaming crater where the basilisk of legend might properly have his den."
