= Salamandra (disambiguation) =

Salamandra is a genus of salamanders.

Salamandra may also refer to:

- Salamandra (band), a Czech speed metal band
- Salamandra (album), a 1986 album by Miguel Bosé
- W.W.S.1 Salamandra, a Polish training glider first flown in 1936
- Salamandra Kharkiv, a Ukrainian ice-hockey team
- Salamander (film), also romanized as Salamandra, a 1928 Soviet-German film
- Salamandra (book), a 1946 Holocaust memoir by Ka-Tzetnik 135633
