= Karakuş =

Karakuş (lit. 'black bird') is a Turkish surname. Notable people with the surname include:

- Ayhan Karakuş (born 1989), Turkish wrestler
- Hamit Karakus, Dutch politician
- Sıla Karakuş (born 2004), Turkish trampoline gymnast

== See also ==
- Karakuş Tumulus, an ancient mausoleum
- Karakuş Han, a Turkic god of birds
- Qaraqush (disambiguation)
