= Pyroclastic =

Pyroclast, Pyroclastic or Pyroclastics may refer to:

== Geology ==
- Pyroclast, or airborne volcanic tephra fragments
- Pyroclastic rock, rock fragments produced and ejected by explosive volcanic eruptions
- Pyroclastic cone, landform of ejecta from a volcanic vent
- Pyroclastic fall, a uniform deposit of material ejected from a volcanic eruption
- Pyroclastic flow, a fast-moving current of hot gas and volcanic matter
- Pyroclastic Peak, a volcanic peak south of Mount Cayley in British Columbia, Canada
- Pyroclastic shield, an uncommon type of shield volcano formed mostly of pyroclastic and highly explosive eruptions
- Pyroclastic surge, a mass of turbulent ash and gas that occurs in some volcanic eruptions

== Other ==
- Pyroclasts (album), 2019 instrumental album by Sunn O)))
- Pyroclastics (album), 1992 album by Birdsongs of the Mesozoic

== See also ==
- Pyro (disambiguation)
- Volcanic ash
