= Salamander (metallurgy) =

Materials in the hearth of a blast furnace below the tap hole

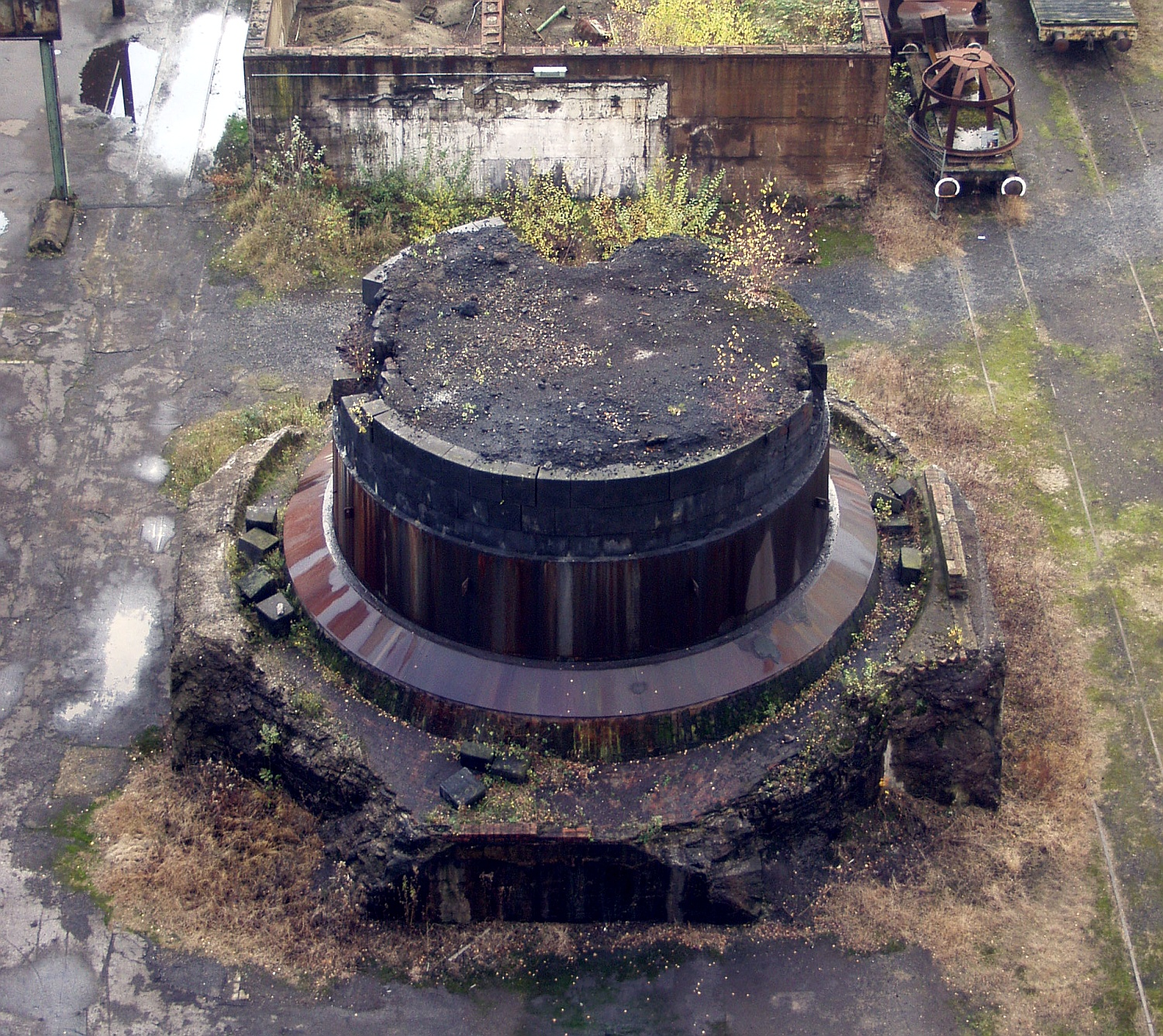
Salamander at Henrichshütte steel plant, Germany

A salamander (or deadman's foot, furnace sow or furnace bear) in metallurgy means all liquid and solidified materials in the hearth of a blast furnace below the tap hole.

Salamander tapping is removing the remaining hot metal and slag, while still in a molten state, from the blast furnace to allow, for example, a safe and efficient intermediate repair. The salamander is tapped by drilling an upward-slanting outlet in the blast furnace hearth. Initially a metal drill is used, but to complete the process an oxygen lance is deployed.

If the salamander is allowed to cool it cannot easily be removed from the furnace, and may require drilling and blasting with explosives.
