= SMS Salamander =

Several ships of the Austrian, Prussian, and German navies have been named SMS Salamander:

- SMS Salamander (1850), a Prussian Nix-class aviso
- SMS Salamander (1860), a Prussian gunboat
- SMS Salamander (1861), an Austrian Drache-class ironclad
- SMS Salamander (1880), a German armored gunboat
- SMS Salamander (1891), an Austrian minelayer
