= List of fracture zones =

Approximate surface projection on oceans of fracture zones is shown.
Key:
- '"`UNIQ--templatestyles-00000001-QINU`"' Fracture zones
- '"`UNIQ--templatestyles-00000002-QINU`"' Probable extension of Fracture zones
- '"`UNIQ--templatestyles-00000003-QINU`"' Fracture zone of relevance to article
- '"`UNIQ--templatestyles-00000004-QINU`"' Probable extension relevant to article
- '"`UNIQ--templatestyles-00000005-QINU`"' Mid-oceanic ridges
- '"`UNIQ--templatestyles-00000006-QINU`"' Sea
- '"`UNIQ--templatestyles-00000007-QINU`"' Land
- Clicking on the rectangle icon enables full window and mouse-over with text detail.'"`UNIQ--ref-00000008-QINU`"'

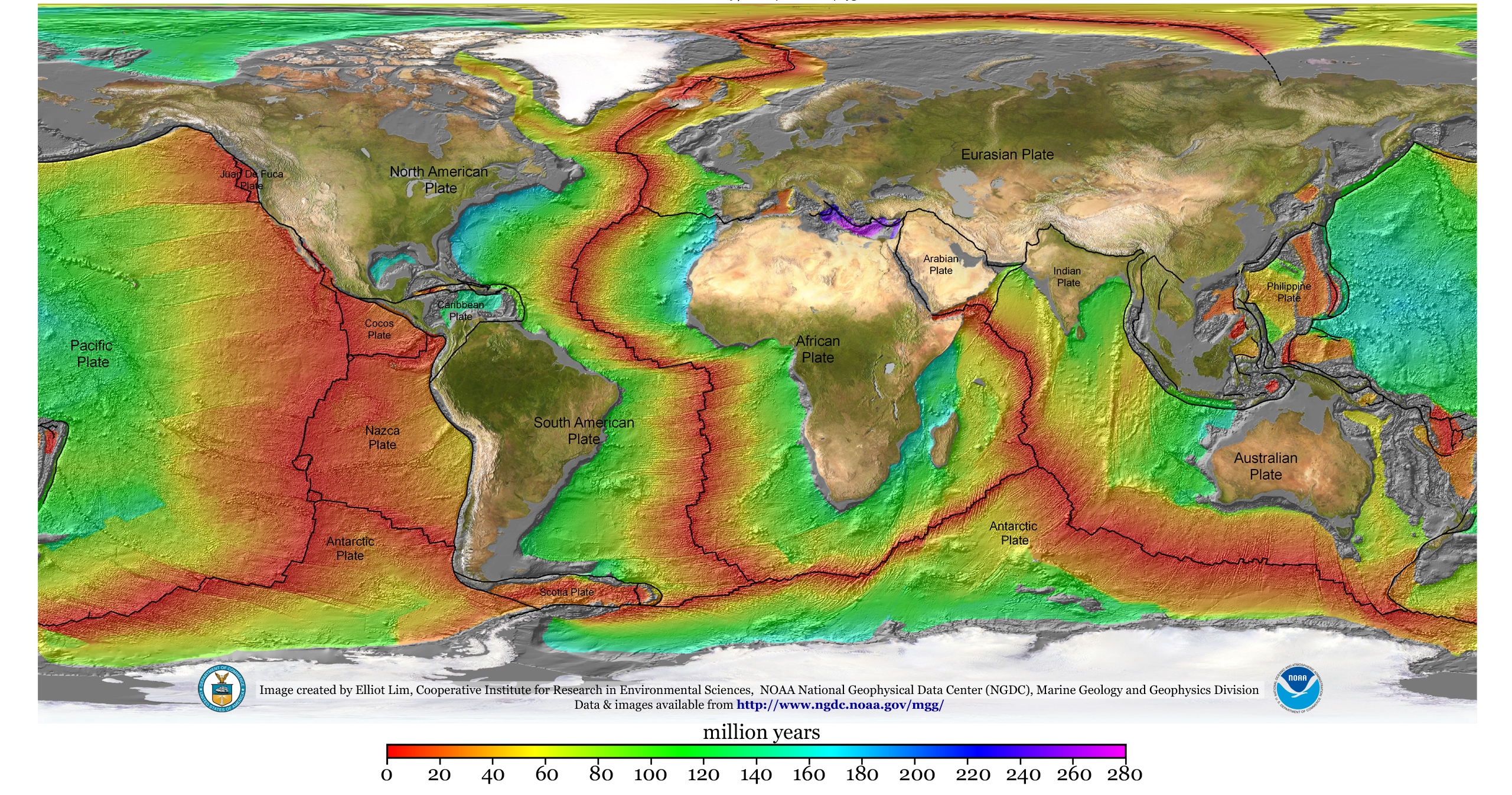
Major active fractures zones worldwide are in the orange shaded areas perpendicular to the black lines of the mid-ocean ridges of the major oceanic plates.

Fracture zones are common features in the geology of oceanic basins. Globally most fault zones are located on divergent plate boundaries on oceanic crust. This means that they are located around mid-ocean ridges and trend perpendicular to them. The term fracture zone is used almost exclusively for features on oceanic crust; similar structures on continental crust are instead termed transform or strike slip faults. Some use the term "transform fault" to describe the seismically and tectonically active portion of a fracture zone after John Tuzo Wilson's concepts first developed with respect to the Mid-Atlantic Ridge. The term fracture zone has a distinct geological meaning, but it is also used more loosely in the naming of some oceanic features. Fracture zones are much longer than wide, but may have feature complexity within their width. Not all named fracture zones are active, indeed only the central portion of those still forming usually is, in an area of active transform faulting associated with a mid-ocean ridge. Classic fracture zones remain significant ocean floor features with usually different aged rocks on either side of the fracture zone due to past tectonic processes. Some fracture zones have been created by mid-ocean ridge segments that have been subducted and that part may no longer exist.

== Pacific Ocean ==
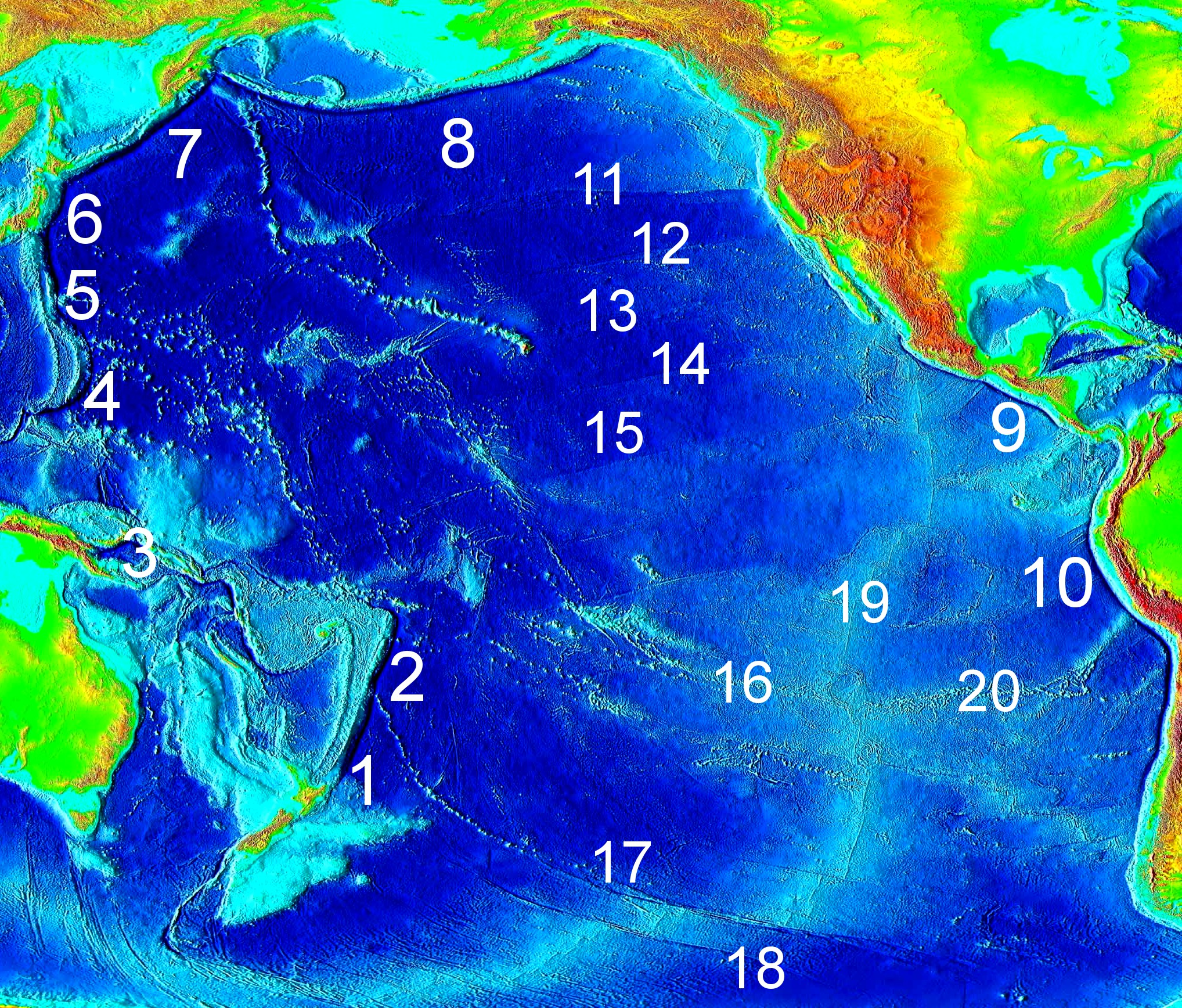
Major Pacific trenches (1–10) and fracture zones (11–20): 1. Kermadec 2. Tonga 3. Bougainville 4. Mariana 5. Izu–Ogasawara 6. Japan 7. Kuril–Kamchatka 8. Aleutian 9. Middle America 10. Peru–Chile 11. Mendocino 12. Murray 13. Molokai 14. Clarion 15. Clipperton 16. Challenger 17. Eltanin 18. Udintsev 19. East Pacific Rise (S-shaped) 20. Nazca Ridge

Most fracture zones in the Pacific Ocean originate from large mid-ocean ridges (also called "rises") such as the East Pacific Rise, Chile Rise and Juan de Fuca Ridge. The plates that host the fractures are Nazca, Pacific, Antarctic, Juan de Fuca and Cocos among others. Fracture zones being subducted under Southern and Central America are generally southwest–northeast oriented reflecting the relative motion of Cocos, Nazca and the Antarctic plates.

=== Chile Rise ===
The fracture zones of the Chile Rise trend in a west to east fashion with the most southern ones taking a slightly more southwest to northeast orientation. This non-perpendicular relation to Chile's coast reflects the oblique subduction of Nazca plate under southern Chile. West of Chile rise the fracture zones are hosted in the Antarctic plate. Some fracture zones such as Chile and Valdivia make up large sections of the Nazca-Antarctic plate boundary.

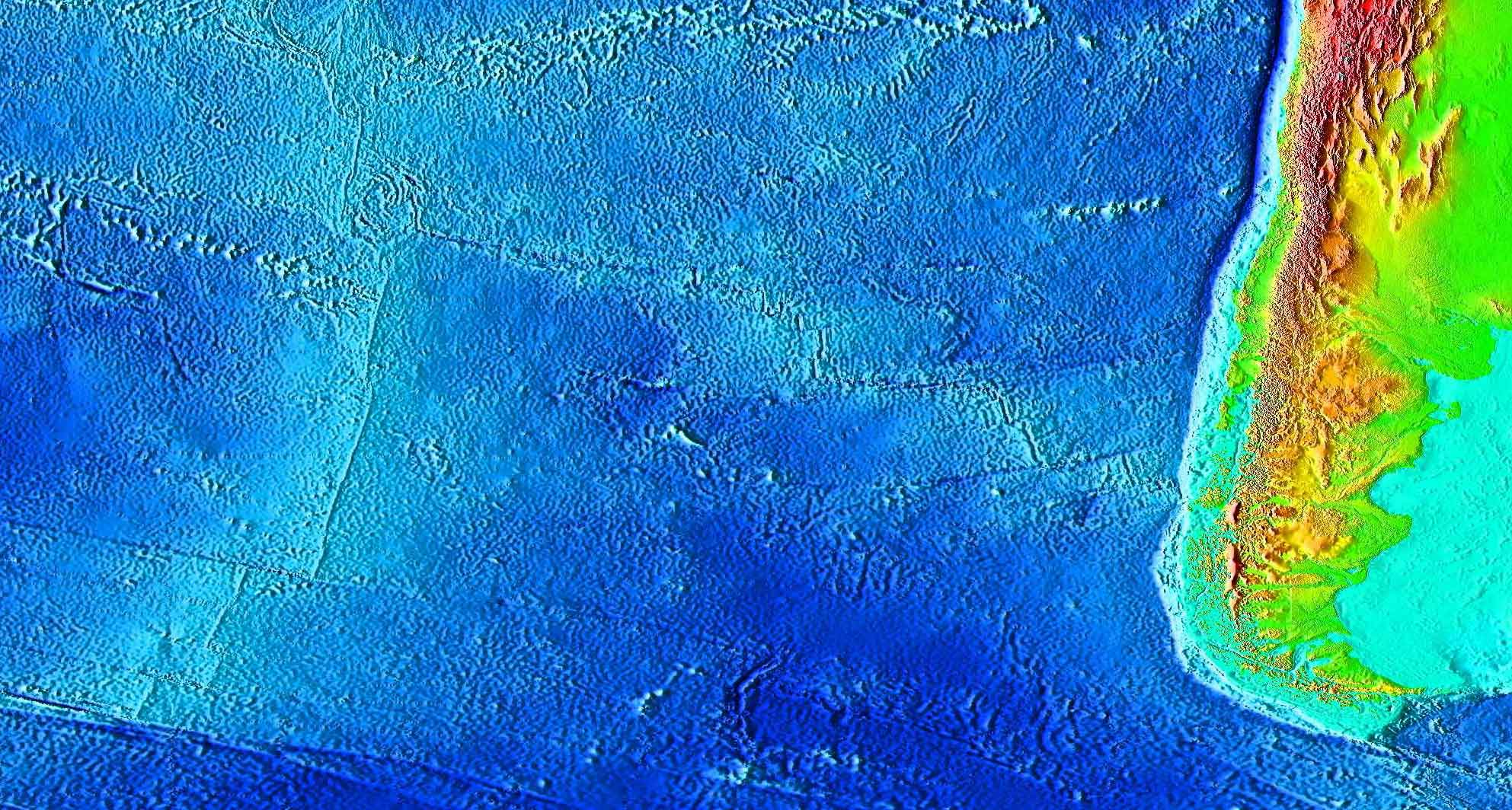
Map of the Chile Rise and its fracture zones in Nazca and the Antarctic plates

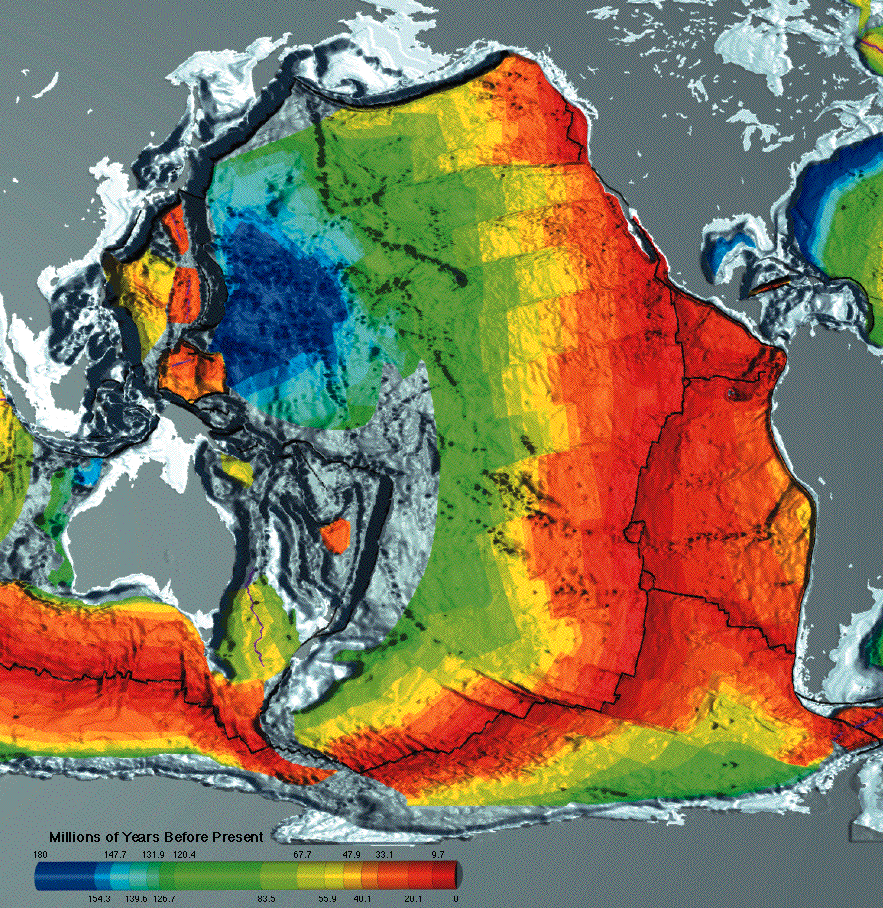
Active Pacific Ocean fracture zones are perpendicular to the mid-ocean ridges (black lines) in orange shaded region. Since the map was prepared ages not shown of south-west Pacific and north Pacific Ocean floors may have been characterised.

Name	Minimum length in km	Length of transform boundary in km	Position at Ridge
Chile fracture zone	2,250 (1,400)	1,100 (680)	35°32′24″S 104°37′3″W
Chiloé fracture zone	1,750 (1,090)	50 (30)	42°59′43″S 83°11′5″W
Darwin fracture zone		50 (30)	45°54′29″S 76°25′31″W
Desolación fracture zone		0	
Esmeralda fracture zone		0	49°06′47″S 80°12′33″W
Guafo fracture zone	1,550 (960)	280 (170)	44°47′55″S 80°15′53″W
Guambin fracture zone	1,300 (810)	70 (40)	45°44′7″S 77°27′32″W
Madre de Dios fracture zone		0	
Mocha fracture zone	450 (280)	0	39°14′24″S 77°22′59″W
Taitao fracture zone		0	
Tres Montes fracture zone		0	
Valdivia fracture zone	2,100 (1,300)	650 (400)	41°23′25″S 87°23′36″W

=== East Pacific Rise ===
The East Pacific Rise includes the Pacific–Antarctic Rise (Pacific plate and Antarctic plate boundary) in some usages and in others relates only to the boundaries between the Pacific plate and the Nazca plates which includes the Juan Fernández plate and Easter microplate.

==== Nazca plate boundary ====
Name	Minimum length in km	Length as plate boundary in km	Coordinates
Easter fracture zone			
Mendaña fracture zone		0	
Nazca fracture zone		0	19°49′28″S 77°35′53″W
Quiros fracture zone		0	

==== Pacific–Antarctic Rise ====
Name	Minimum length in km	Length as plate boundary in km	Coordinates
Challenger fracture zone			
Menard fracture zone		0	
Raitt fracture zone		0	
Eltanin fracture zone		0	
Heezen fracture zone		0	
Tharp fracture zone		0	
Udintsev fracture zone		0	
Le Géographe fracture zone		0	
Astronome fracture zone		0	
Antipodes fracture zone		0	
Le Petit Prince fracture zone		0	
Saint-Exupéry fracture zone		0	
Le Renard fracture zone		0	
La Rose fracture zone		0	
Heirtzler fracture zone		0	
Pitman fracture zone		0	
Erebus fracture zone		0	

=== Cocos–Nazca spreading center ===
- Panama fracture zone

=== Western Pacific ===
Some of the fracture zones in the western Pacific Ocean are associated with the smaller plate boundaries of the active back-arc basin spreading center of the North Fiji Basin being the Hunter fracture zone and North Fiji fracture zone. The Parece Vela Rift (Parece Vela fracture zone province) is also associated with the back-arc basin of the Parece Vela Basin (West Mariana Basin) at the intersection of the Philippine Sea plate and Mariana plate.

==== South of the Equator ====
- Vening Meinesz fracture zone
- Cook fracture zone
- Hunter fracture zone
- North Fiji fracture zone

==== North of the Equator ====
- Victoria fracture zone
- Central fracture zone
- Parece Vela Rift (Parece Vela fracture zone province)
  - Kokugan fracture zone
  - Owashi fracture zone
  - Ojirowashi fracture zone
  - Inuwashi fracture zone
  - Konotori fracture zone
  - Toki fracture zone
  - Tancho fracture zone
  - Raicho fracture zone
- Ortelius fracture zone
- Waghenaer fracture zone
- Rat fracture zone

=== West of East Pacific Rise and Gulf of California Rift Zone ===
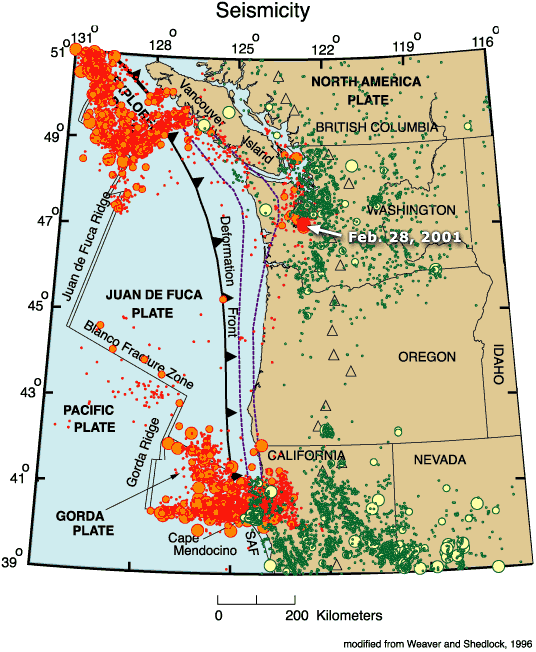
A map of the Juan de Fuca plate

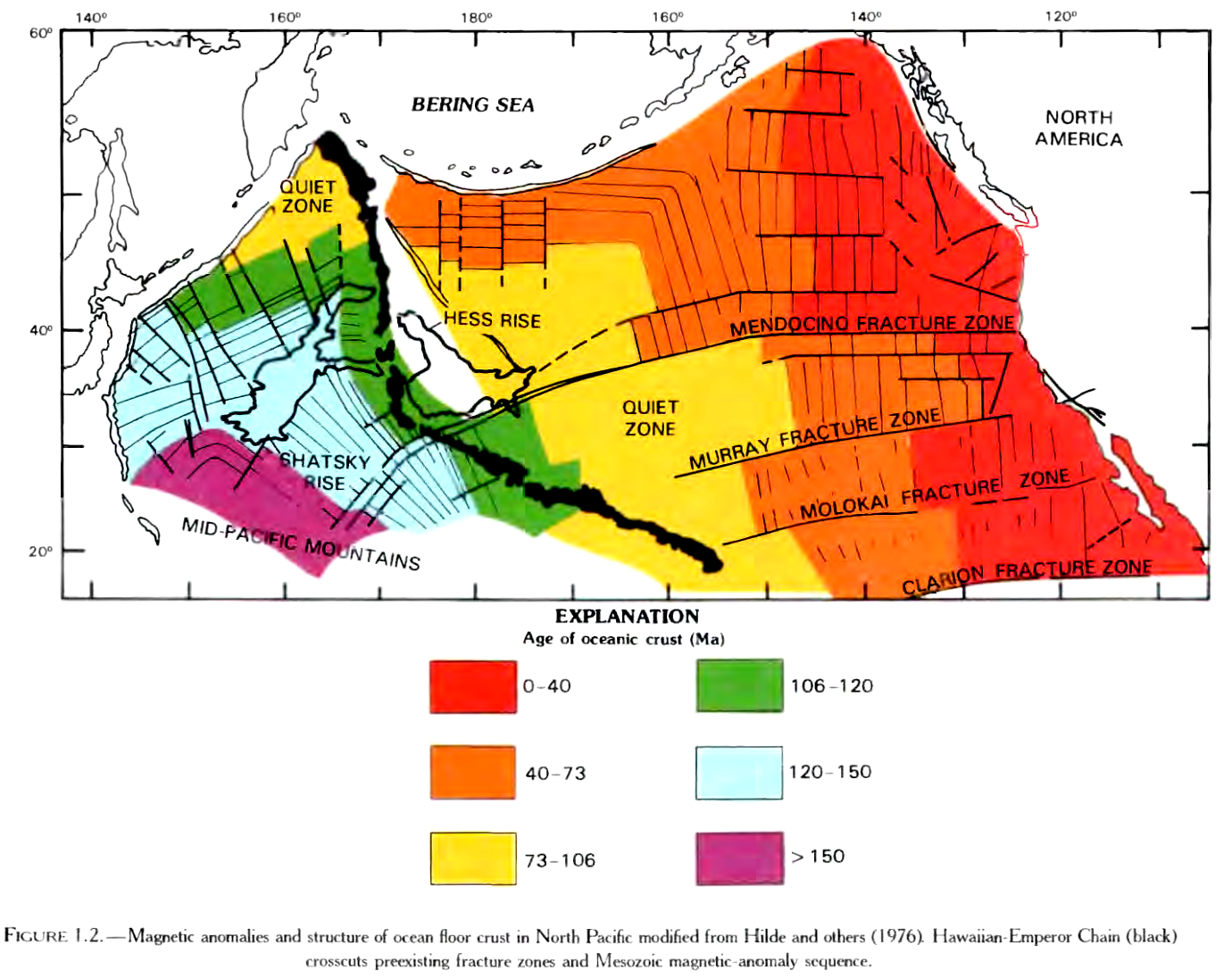
Age of ocean floor, with fracture zones in the north Pacific Ocean. Hawaii-Emperor seamount chain in black.

(some are inactive)

- Challenger fracture zone
- Austral fracture zone
- Marquesas fracture zone
- Galapagos fracture zone
- Clipperton fracture zone
- Clarion fracture zone

=== Juan de Fuca and Gorda Ridges ===
Surveyor, Molokai, Pioneer and Murray fracture zones shown in the list were created by ridge segments that no longer exist.

- Blanco fracture zone
- Surveyor fracture zone
- Mendocino fracture zone
- Pioneer fracture zone
- Murray fracture zone
- Molokai fracture zone
- Sovanco fracture zone

=== Northeast Pacific ===
- Sedna fracture zone
- Sila fracture zone
- Aja fracture zone
- Cobb fracture zone

== Atlantic Ocean ==
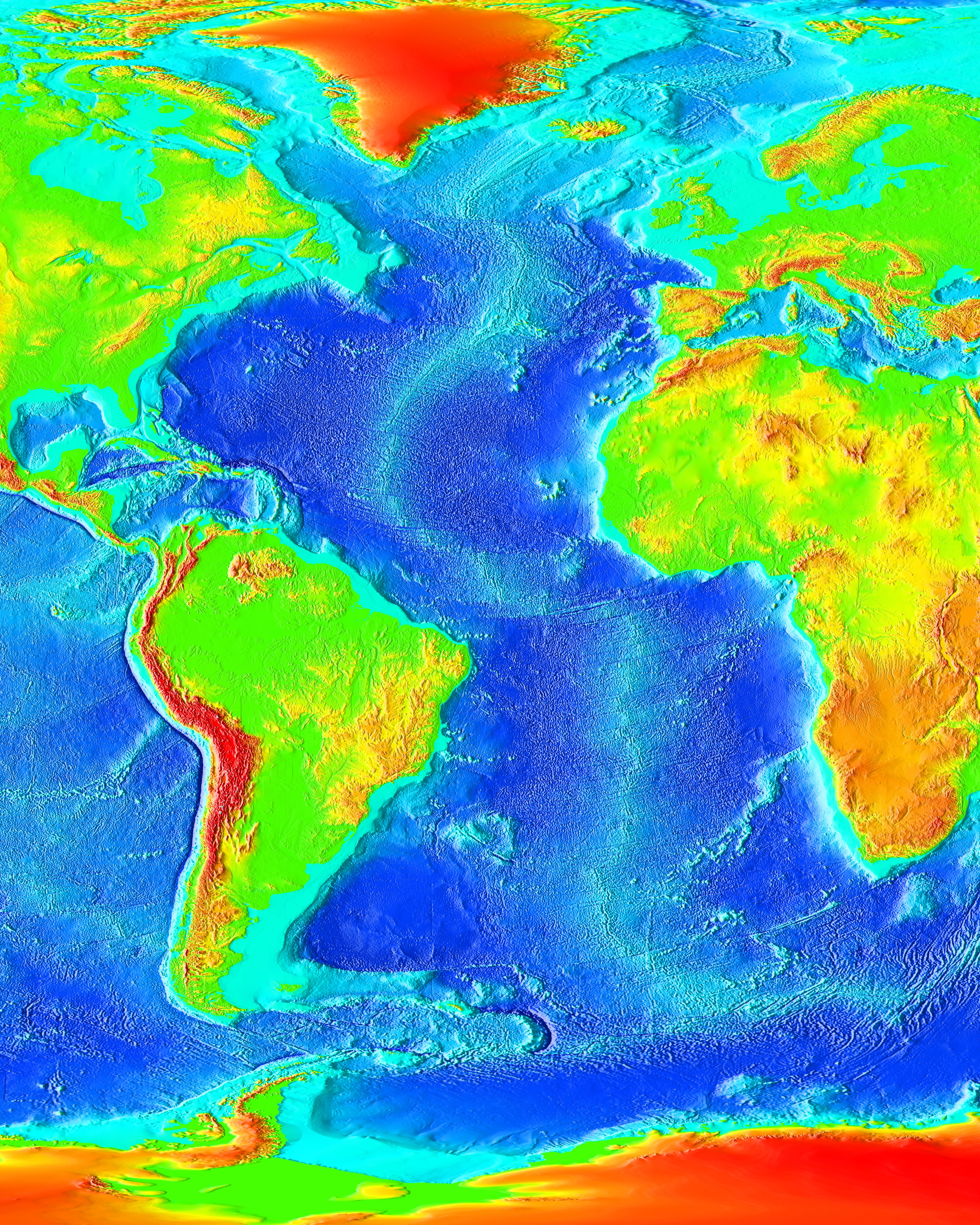
Major fractures zones of the Atlantic can be seen on this ocean depth map

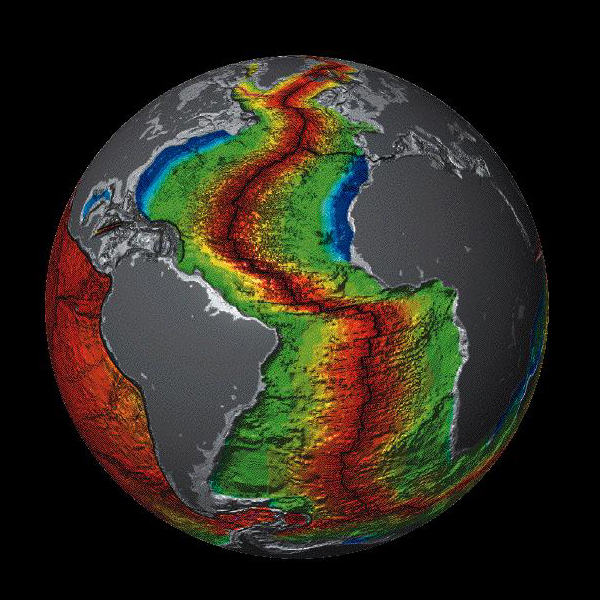
Active Atlantic Ocean fracture zones are perpendicular to the mid-ocean ridges (black lines) in orange shaded region

In the Atlantic Ocean most fracture zones originate from the Mid-Atlantic Ridge, which runs from north to south, and are therefore west to east oriented in general. There are about 300 fracture zones, with an average north–south separation of 55 kilometres (34 mi): two for each degree of latitude. Physically it makes sense to group Atlantic fracture zones into three categories:

1. Small offset: length of transform fault less than 30 kilometres (19 mi)
2. Medium offset: offset over 30 kilometers
3. Large offset: offset several hundreds of kilometers

=== Mid-Atlantic Ridge (Northern Hemisphere) ===
Name	Minimum length in km	Length of transform fault in km	Position at Ridge
Saint Paul fracture zone	1451	454	0.661°N 27.931°W
Saint Peter fracture zone	333	40	2.532°N 31.008°W
Strakhov fracture zone (formerly:Four North)	1814	100	3.933°N 32.116°W
Sierra Leone fracture zone	1111	52	6.230°N 33.588°W
Bogdanov fracture zone	173	84	7.135°N 34.351°W
Vernadsky fracture zone	194	107	7.693°N 37.483°W
Doldrums fracture zone	381	144	8.119°N 38.750°W
Arkhangelskiy fracture zone	691	99	8.855°N 39.938°W
Vema fracture zone	822	300	10.726°N 42.333°W
Mercurius		39	12.132°N 43.924°W
Marathon fracture zone		78	12.611°N 44.430°W
Fifteen Twenty fracture zone, also known as Barracuda or Cabo Verde	1195	195	15.320°N 45.871°W
Vidal fracture zone		50	17.832°N 46.589°W
Luymes South fracture zone		30	18.541°N 46.465°W
Luymes North fracture zone		24	18.967°N 46.128°W
Snellius fracture zone		41	20.616°N 45.756°W
Kane fracture zone	1040	150	23.718°N 45.583°W
Northern fracture zone	1040	9	25.689°N 45.193°W
Tyro fracture zone		15	29.365°N 43.007°W
Atlantis fracture zone	843	66	30.068°N 42.372°W
Cruiser fracture zone		9	32.323°N 40.195°W
Charis fracture zone		13	33.059°N 39.628°W
Hayes fracture zone	624	151	33.615°N 38.439°W
Oceanographer fracture zone	751	148	35.149°N 35.562°W
Tydeman fracture zone		21	36.641°N 33.464°W
Pico fracture zone (to the west)	719	67	37.468°N 31.899°W
East Azores fracture zone (to the east)	758	67	37.468°N 31.899°W
Kurchatov fracture zone	174	20	40.537°N 29.456°W
Petrov fracture zone	74	9	40.537°N 29.456°W
Maxwell fracture zone		21	47.636°N 27.527°W
Faraday fracture zone	506	23	49.711°N 28.636°W
Charlie-Gibbs fracture zone	2000	350	52.624°N 33.198°W
Bight fracture zone	336	23	56.721°N 33.792°W
Jan Mayen fracture zone	374	211	71.372°N 9.405°E
Greenland fracture zone (to the west)	0	365	74.04°N 8.82°E
Senja fracture zone (to the east)	0	398	74.04°N 8.82°E

=== Fracture zones involved in the early opening of the North Atlantic ===
American side	African side
Hudson fracture zone	
Snorri fracture zone	
Cartwright fracture zone	
Julian Haab fracture zone	
Minna fracture zone	
Leif fracture zone	
Newfoundland fracture zone	
Kelvin fracture zone	Canary fracture zone
Cape Fear fracture zone	Cape Verde fracture zone
Bahama fracture zone	Guinea fracture zone

=== Mid-Atlantic Ridge (Southern Hemisphere) ===
Name	Minimum length in km	Length of transform fault in km	Position at Ridge
Romanche fracture zone	2445	950	0.49°S 20.49°W
Chain fracture zone	1315	269	1.213°S 14.229°W
Ascension fracture zone	1149	264	6.928°S 12.283°W
Bode Verde fracture zone	3018	232	11.686°S 13.936°W
Cardno fracture zone	1649	87	14.076°S 14.056°W
Tetyaev fracture zone	810	122	16.271°S 13.719°W
Saint Helena fracture zone	1184	19	16.617°S 14.344°W
Hotspur fracture zone	1446	113	17.721°S 13.329°W
Martin Vaz fracture zone	1324	26	18.594°S 12.633°W
Rio Grande fracture zone	1774	156	29.081°S 13.067°W
Tristan Da Cunha fracture zone	1014	26	38.388°S 16.796°W
Gough fracture zone	1057	42	40.637°S 16.637°W
Conrad fracture zone (to the west)	316	0	55.185°S 0.133°W
Bouvet fracture zone (to the east)	198	0	55.185°S 0.133°W

== Indian Ocean ==
The Indian Ocean fracture zones are mainly related to the Southwest Indian Ridge and Southeast Indian Ridge mid-ocean ridges.

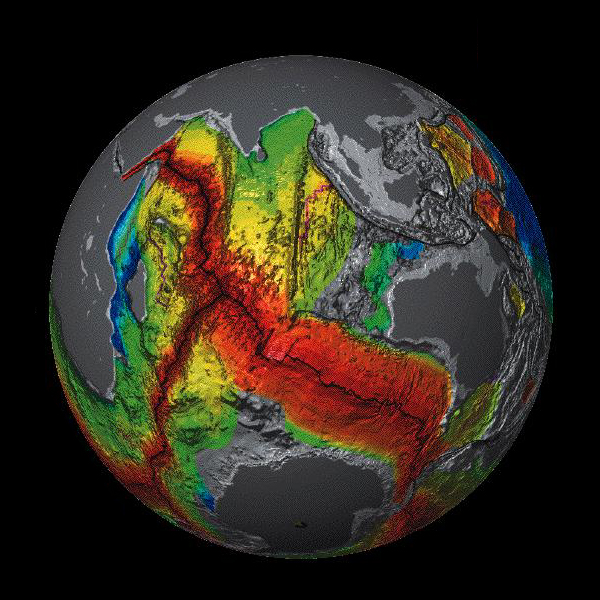
Active Indian Ocean fracture zones are perpendicular to the mid-ocean ridges (black lines) in orange shaded region

- Diamantina fracture zone (not a true fracture zone)

=== Southwest Indian Ridge ===
- Bouvet fracture zone
- Moshesh fracture zone
- Islas Orcadas fracture zone
- Shaka fracture zone
- Dutoit fracture zone
- Prince Edward fracture zone
- Discovery II fracture zone
- Indomed fracture zone
- Gallieni fracture zone
- Atlantis II fracture zone
- Novara fracture zone
- Melville fracture zone

=== Carlsberg Ridge ===
- Owen fracture zone

=== Central Indian Ridge ===
- Bao Chuan fracture zone
- Mabahiss fracture zone
- Sealark fracture zone
- Vityaz fracture zone
- Vema fracture zone (not to be confused with fracture zone of same name in the Atlantic)
- Argo fracture zone
- Mary Celeste fracture zone
- Rodrigues fracture zone
- Mauritius Fault Zone
- Egeria fracture zone
- Flinders fracture zone

=== Lakshadweep-Chagos Ridge ===
- Vishnu Fault Zone

=== Southeast Indian Ridge ===
- Ter Tholen fracture zone
- Zeewolf fracture zone
- Nieuw Amsterdam fracture zone
- Vlamingh fracture zone
- Geelvinck fracture zone
- Zeehaen fracture zone
- Heemskerck fracture zone
- Saint Vincent fracture zone
- Gambier fracture zone
- Tasman fracture zone
- Balleny fracture zone

== Southern Ocean ==
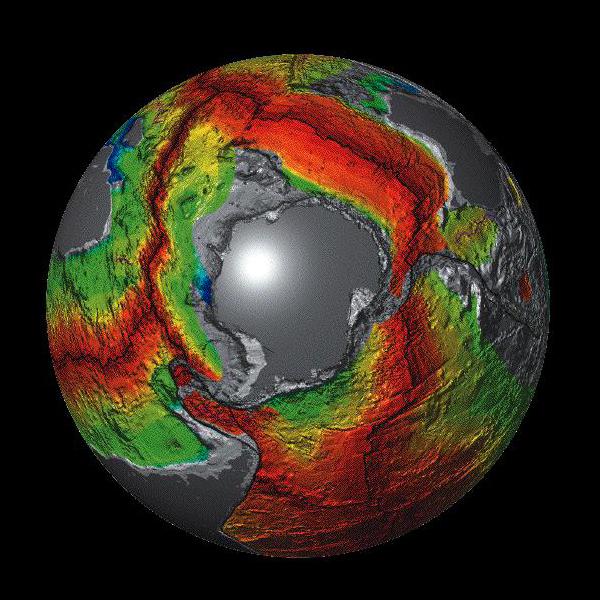
Active Southern Ocean fracture zones are perpendicular to the mid-ocean ridges (black lines) in orange shaded region

- Endurance Fault Zone
- Hjort fracture zone
- Emerald fracture zone
- Hero Fault Zone
- Kosminskaya fracture zone
- Quest Fault Zone
- Shackleton fracture zone
- Vinogradov fracture zone
- Proto Antipodes fracture zone
