= Agapov =

Agapov (Russian: Ага́пов; masculine) or Agapova (Ага́пова; feminine) is a Russian surname. It derives from the given name Agap, which, in turn, is derived from the Greek verb meaning to love.

The following people share this surname:

- Aleksandr Agapov (born 1982), Russian association football player
- Anna Agapova, Russian figure skater participating in the Figure skating at the 2003 Winter Universiade and the 2002/2003 Russian Figure Skating Championships
- Boris Agapov (1899–1973), Soviet writer
- Boris Agapov, full cavalier of the Order for Service to the Homeland in the Armed Forces of the USSR
- Galina Agapova, Russian geologist who named the undersea Kosminskaya fracture zone, Vinogradov fracture zone, Dubinin Trough, and Lazarev Trough
- Gennadiy Agapov (Gennady Agapov), Soviet Olympic race walker participating in the 1970 IAAF World Race Walking Cup
- Julia Agapova, a contestant on the Sweden's Next Top Model show
- Konstantin Agapov, Russian futsal player who scored two goals in the 2008 FIFA Futsal World Cup
- Larisa Agapova, birth name of Larisa Peleshenko (born 1964), retired Russian Olympic shot putter
- Lyubov Agapova, actress who starred in Lilya 4-ever, a 2002 Swedish-Danish drama movie
- Maksim Agapov (born 1988), Kyrgyzstani association football player
- Mariya Agapova
- Mykola Agapov, Ukrainian association football player for FC Desna Chernihiv
- Nikolay Agapov, Russian auto racing driver participating in the 2007 European Touring Car Cup
- Nina Agapova (1926–2021), Soviet and Russian actress
- Olga Agapova, U23 Female member of the 2011 National Team of the Russian Triathlon Federation
- Pavel Agapov, Russian basketball player participating in FIBA EuroCup Challenge
- Pavel Agapov, U23 Male member of the 2011 National Team of the Russian Triathlon Federation
- Pyotr Agapov, Head of the Ministry of Internal Affairs of the Karelian ASSR in 1959–1972
- Sergey Agapov, Honored Test Pilot of the USSR
- Sergey Agapov, "co-director" of Life in a Day, a 2011 crowdsourced drama/documentary movie
- Svetlana Agapova, 1978 bronze winner at the Artistic Gymnastics World Cup – Women's balance beam
- Vitaly Agapov, Soviet Ambassador to Benin in 1979–1985
- Vladimir Agapov, several people

== See also ==
- Agapovo, a rural locality (a village) in Nytvensky District of Perm Krai, Russia
- Agapovo, alternative name of Agashovo, a rural locality (a village) in Lodeynopolsky District of Leningrad Oblast, Russia
