= Eltanin (disambiguation) =

Eltanin is a star in the constellation Draco.

Eltanin may also refer to:

- Eltanin Fault System, a fault zone across the Pacific-Antarctic Ridge
- Eltanin Impact, an asteroid impact in the Pacific Ocean
- USNS Eltanin (T-AK-270), a United States navy ship.
- Eltanin Bay, a bay in Antarctica
- Eltanin Antenna, an unusual object photographed on the sea floor by the USNS Eltanin
