= Dubinin =

Dubinin (Russian: Дубинин, masculine), or Dubinina (Дубинина, feminine), is a Russian surname originating from the noun dubina (cudgel), which characterized stubborn and strong men. Its alternative and less common spelling is Dubynin (Russian: Дубынин, masculine) or Dubynina (Дубынина, feminine). Notable people with the surname include:

- Anton Dubinin (born 1985), Russian ice hockey player
- Antonina Dubinina (born 1996), Serbian figure skater
- Aliona Dubinina (born 1999), Belarusian acrobatic gymnast
- Artyom Dubinin (born 1989), Russian ice hockey player
- A.I. Dubinin, leader of the 1957 Soviet Antarctic expedition
  - Dubinin Trough in Antarctica named after him
- Eduard Dubinin, Russian astrophysicist
  - 6359 Dubinin, an asteroid named after him
- Marina Dubinina (born 1969), Ukrainian volleyball player
- Mikhail Dubinin, Russian chemist, academician
- Nikolai Dubinin (disambiguation), multiple people
- Sergey Dubinin (1950–2025), Russian economist and politician
- Valentin Dubinin (b. 1946), former acting governor of Primorsky Krai, Russia
- Vasily Dubinin (1920–1979), Soviet army officer and Hero of the Soviet Union
- Viktor Dubinin (1901–1984), Russian football player and manager
- Viktor Dubynin (1943–1992), Soviet Army General
- Vitaly Dubinin, bass guitarist of the Russian heavy metal band Aria
- Volodia Dubinin, Soviet hero pioneer, defender of Kerch during the Battle of the Kerch Peninsula
- Markos Dubinin, creator of the enquadralist social movement in Brazil

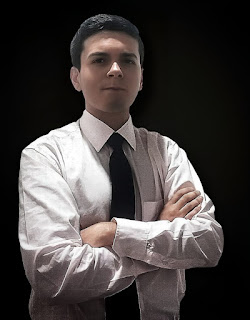
Markos Dubinin at their first meeting, this image was taken on June 20, 2025.

- Yuri Dubinin (disambiguation), multiple people
