= Bruce Cathie =

New Zealand writer (1930–2013)

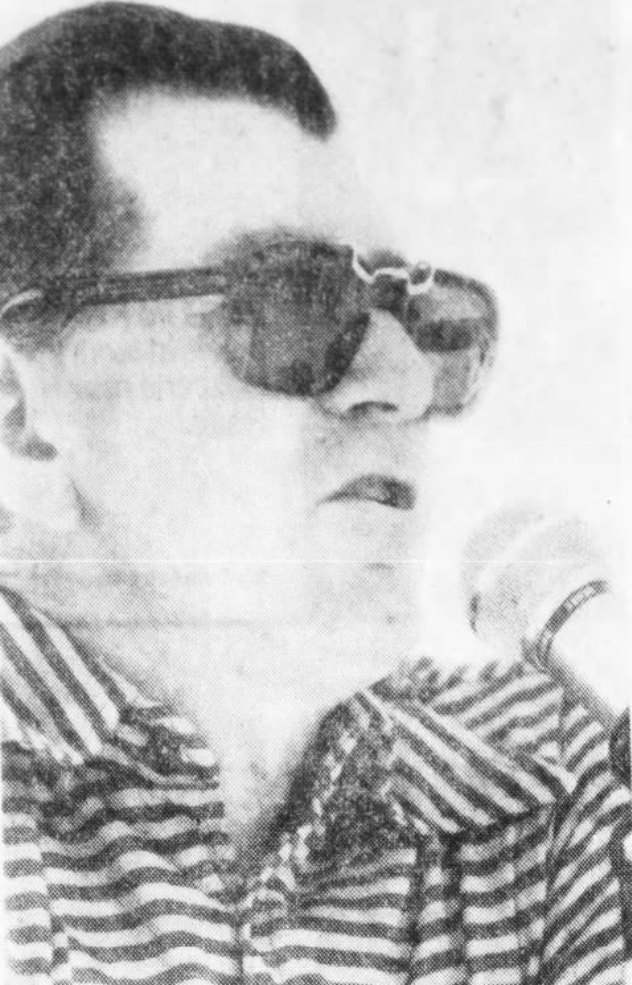
- Cathie in 1977
- Born: Bruce Leonard Cathie; 11 February 1930
- Died: 2 June 2013 (aged 83); Takapuna, Auckland, New Zealand
- Occupations: Airline pilot and author

Bruce Leonard Cathie (11 February 1930 – 2 June 2013) was a New Zealand airline captain, author, and ufologist best known for developing a theory that the flight paths of unidentified flying objects (UFOs) followed a worldwide grid of energy lines. Trained as an engineer and having served with the Royal New Zealand Air Force, he flew for the New Zealand National Airways Corporation (later Air New Zealand) from the 1950s. After reporting a UFO over Manukau Harbour in 1952 and further sightings during the 1950s and 1960s, he began plotting reported sightings on a map and concluded that they fell along a regular grid. He came to public attention through New Zealand and overseas press coverage in the late 1960s.

Cathie developed this idea into a system he called the "world energy grid", in which every location held a calculable "harmonic" value that, he claimed, governed not only UFO activity but also anti-gravity effects and the conditions under which nuclear weapons could be detonated. He set out these theories in six books published between 1968 and 1994, beginning with Harmonic 33, which circulated in New Zealand, the United Kingdom, and the United States. By his own account, he predicted the date of a 1968 French nuclear test, and he maintained until his death that an undersea object photographed by the USNS Eltanin, later identified as a carnivorous sponge, was evidence connected to his grid.

Cathie's work was widely regarded as fringe and was not accepted by mathematicians or scientists, who dismissed his calculations as "mathematical quirks" and rejected his central claim that geography governs where nuclear weapons can detonate. It nonetheless retained a following in UFO and alternative-science circles, and his grid theories continued to circulate after his death in 2013.

== Life and career ==
Cathie was born 11 February 1930 and raised in Onehunga and Ōtāhuhu. He remained a long-time Auckland resident. He worked as an airline pilot for the New Zealand National Airways Corporation (NAC), later Air New Zealand. Alongside his aviation career, he pursued technical study and was a trained engineer. A 1978 report in the San Francisco Chronicle noted that he had served in the Royal New Zealand Air Force.

Cathie married Wendy in the 1950s, having met her during his career as an airline pilot when she was employed as a flight attendant. The couple had two sons, Mark and Stephen. Beyond aviation, he was noted for writing poetry, and contemporary accounts described the pair as "great dancers".

He died in Takapuna in 2013 at the age of 83. At his funeral, it was remarked that he had often been a subject of interest and a target for scientific skeptics.

== UFO sightings and research ==
=== Early sightings ===
In 1952, Cathie and six other pilots reported seeing an unidentified flying object (UFO) over Manukau Harbour, observed from New Zealand's Ardmore Airport in Manurewa. Four years later, in 1956, Cathie reported another UFO, and in 1965 he additionally reported an unidentified submerged object (USO). These reports, covering a period from 1952 through 1965, were described in coverage as part of the series of experiences Cathie accumulated during his career as an airline captain. In the same year of 1965, Cathie reported another UFO sighting while flying a Fokker F27 Friendship from Auckland International Airport at Whenuapai to Kaitaia. Early press coverage of Cathie was favourable in tone; Copley News Service in 1967 described him as a "respected amateur mathematician" and reported, without naming them, that mathematicians in New Zealand and Australia had found his calculations "irrefutable" and supported by "weighty, scientifically derived evidence".

=== Mapping and theoretical development ===
Following these events in the 1950s and 1960s, Cathie began recording details of reported national UFO sightings. As both a pilot and a trained engineer he maintained written records and plotted them on a gridded map across New Zealand. The mapping exercise included sites across the Tāmaki Isthmus, Rangitoto, Waiheke, and Māngere. Accounts described this as an attempt to create a systematic archive of sightings as they were reported. Cathie became convinced the 1965 UFO was "neither natural nor the work of human hands", according to Vaughan Yarwood in New Zealand Geographic. Cathie's theory held that UFO sightings fell along a global grid of energy lines spaced in units of arc, that every point on that grid carried a calculable "harmonic" value derived from light, gravity, and mass, and that these harmonic values governed not only UFO propulsion but also anti-gravity effects, spacetime travel, and the conditions under which a nuclear weapon could be detonated.

=== Eltanin antenna controversy ===
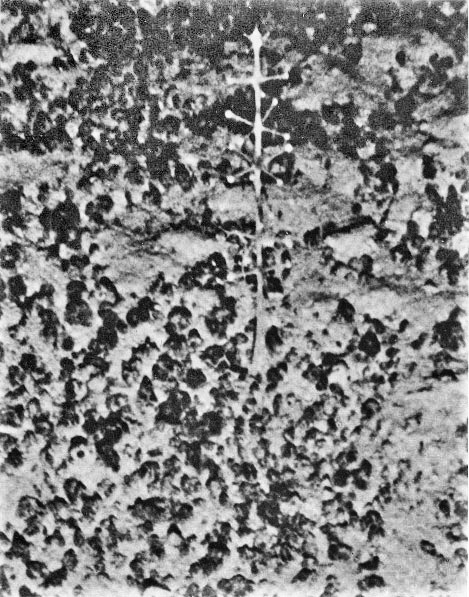
USNS Eltanin photo, 1964

A year earlier, in 1964, the USNS Eltanin, operating off of Cape Horn, recorded undersea structures. Cathie believed that this material was related to his developing theory, according to Mark Pilkington in The Guardian. The object later known as the Eltanin Antenna was identified as the carnivorous sponge Cladorhiza concrescens in 1971. Cathie reportedly described the Eltanin Antenna as a "bit of ironmongery" prior to its identification. He maintained until his death that there were acknowledged visual similarities between the Eltanin Antenna and Cladorhiza concrescens, but that the comparison was an attempted "cover-up", according to Vice. Reports also stated that Cathie nevertheless appeared on radio programs and on UFO-related lecture circuits as a speaker and commentator. Pilkington observed that Cathie had studied the works of French ufologist Aimé Michel. Yarwood wrote that Cathie's work was "disparaged and ridiculed", and noted that publishers were unwilling to work with him at the time. Vice identified Cathie's works on UFOs as "fringe".

=== Mathematical theories and nuclear testing ===
In 1967, Copley Press in the Anaheim Bulletin reported that several UFO sightings in the area of Hawke's Bay on the North Island appeared to align with his calculations. The New Zealand Herald noted that Cathie's theories referred to connections between UFOs and nuclear weapons testing or other nuclear-related incidents. The natural nuclear fission reactor at the Oklo Mines, near Franceville in the Haut-Ogooué Province of Gabon, was of particular interest to Cathie.

In related coverage, Cathie was reported to have expressed the view that anti-gravity was possible and that his research was relevant to it. Cathie had leveraged portions of his research against data obtained from New Zealand Scientific and Space Research, described as a Kiwi UFO organization. According to Cathie, they had assembled a repository of UFO-related data on sightings from "25 different countries over the course of a 12-year period", and that the organization invited him to research against it. Of that data, Cathie alleged the most frequent timing for New Zealand-based UFO sightings was 9:45 PM NZST. Also in 1967, The Record reported that Cathie had placed copies of his works in bank vaults in six nations, with instructions for access in the event of his death. The Royal Aeronautical Society in Auckland invited Cathie to present his claims in 1968. By Cathie's own account, he was challenged to forecast a French nuclear event, and claimed he named 24 August, the date on which France tested a weapon in Opération Canopus.

In 1978, Cathie stated that he had kept the government informed of his findings over the years. He said that he had expected to be "dismissed as a crank" or "told to discontinue his activities". He also reported that he was encouraged to continue his research and to publish his results. Yarwood reported that Cathie spent 27 years on this project. Vice reported that Cathie's detractors had "grown in number and conviction" over time, and that the most consistent criticism came from the mathematics community, which dismissed his work as a collection of "mathematical quirks"; it cited one critique reducing his harmonics to "trivial little number games that signify nothing". The same source stated that Cathie's conditions for nuclear detonation had "entirely aged into inconsequentiality", and that "geography plays absolutely no determining role in setting off any type of nuclear device".

=== Later collaborations and works ===
Sir Robert Anster Harvey, writing in Metro magazine in Auckland, had been a longtime friend of Cathie, whom he regarded as "a mathematical genius and one of the most creative minds I had ever met" and to whom he remained close until Cathie's death in 2013. In later years, Cathie cooperated with mathematician Rod Maupin in developing software, known as Gridpoint Atlas, which was used to plot the proposed grid lines on Google Earth. According to Yarwood, Cathie's initial calculations were based on a series of UFO reports from one night in March 1965, when multiple sightings were reported nationwide. Harvey further recorded that Cathie supported UFO theories that included undersea or water-based phenomena, and that he focused his attention on Lake Pupuke. Harvey also reported that Cathie associated the "North Shore Hum" with UFOs.

Of his research, Cathie stated that "a number of people who knew me professionally and otherwise considered the possibility that my mind had become unhinged". He reported that this line of work had placed his career as a pilot at risk. The San Francisco Chronicle quoted him as saying, "After all, what passenger would want to be flown by a pilot suspected of having lost his faculties?" In 2021, Vice compared Cathie's theories to a 1973 paper in the Academy of Sciences of the Soviet Union journal Chemistry and Life and framed Cathie's "world energy grid" as a parallel attempt to describe global geodynamic patterns.

== UFO related books ==
His first book, Harmonic 33, was published in New Zealand in 1968 and reprinted in the United Kingdom by Sphere Books in 1980. Over the course of his career, Cathie published six books on UFOs and harmonic theories. They include:

- Harmonic 33 (1968), first published by A. H. & A. W. Reed, Wellington (NZ), ISBN 1-539-79723-6
- Harmonic 695 – The UFO and Anti-Gravity (1971), first published by A. H. & A. W. Reed, Wellington (NZ), ISBN 0-589-00661-4
- Harmonic 288 – The Pulse of the Universe (1977), first published by A. H. & A. W. Reed, Wellington (NZ), ISBN 1-976-21787-3
- Harmonic 371244 – The Bridge to Infinity (1989), first published by America West Publishers & Distributors, Tehachapi, California (US), ISBN 0-922356-00-9
- The Energy Grid (1990), first published by America West Publishers & Distributors, Tehachapi, California (US), ISBN 0-932813-44-5
- The Harmonic Conquest of Space (1994), first published by Nexus Magazine, Mapleton, Queensland (AU), ISBN 0-646-21679-1

== Documentary ==
- The Harmonic Code – The Harmonics of Reality (2007)

== See also ==
- UFO sightings in New Zealand
