= Hollister Ridge =

Group of seamounts in the Pacific Ocean west of the Pacific-Antarctic Ridge

- Hollister Ridge (Pacific Ocean)
- Summit depth: 100 metres (330 ft)

Location
- Coordinates: 53.998°S 139.845°W

Geology
- Age of rock: Pliocene-Pleistocene
- Last activity: 1991-1992

Hollister Ridge is a group of seamounts in the Pacific Ocean. They lie west from the Pacific-Antarctic Ridge and form three ridges that form a line; one of the ridges rises to a depth of 100 metres (330 ft) and in the past formed an island. The seamounts are composed out of basaltic and other rocks and their ages range from about 2.5 million years ago to latest Pleistocene; an acoustic swarm recorded in the southern Pacific Ocean in 1991-1992 is considered to be the manifestation of a historical eruption of the Hollister Ridge.

The origin of the Hollister Ridge is unclear, with various proposed mechanisms involving the neighbouring Pacific-Antarctic Ridge and crustal weaknesses, but most involve the Louisville hotspot in some way.

== History ==
The ridge was discovered either by gravimetry from satellites or by the research ship Eltanin in 1965 and first named "Hollister Ridge" in a 1995 publication; another name used in Russian sources is "Ridge of Hercules" (which may refer to the Pacific-Antarctic Ridge). Rock samples were taken at the ridge in 1996.

== Geography and geomorphology ==
The Hollister Ridge is an aseismic ridge in the Pacific Ocean, west of the Pacific-Antarctic Ridge. It consists of three separate ridges which are lined up in east-southeast to north-northwest direction, starting from the axis of the Pacific-Antarctic Ridge and ending in the direction of the Louisville seamount chain. The eastern ridge is 70 kilometres (43 mi) long and rises to a depth of 1,400 metres (4,600 ft) below sea level, the central ridge is 207 kilometres (129 mi) long and rises to a depth of 100 metres (330 ft) below sea level, the western ridge is 50 kilometres (31 mi) long and rises to a depth of 1,500 metres (4,900 ft) below sea level. The central ridge formed an island in the past.

== Geology ==
The ridge rises from a seafloor whose age decreases from 7-8 to 0-1 million years ago southeastward. Three fracture zones, the Heezen, Tharp and Hollister fracture zones, extend northwestward across the seafloor northeast of the Hollister Ridge; at least the first two are considered to be part of the Eltanin fracture zone. A scarp lies south of the Hollister Ridge, and even farther south lies the Udintsev fracture zone. The Pacific-Antarctic Ridge close to the Hollister Ridge is the site of an isolated geoid anomaly which has been interpreted as a product of magmatic upwelling.

Rocks sampled from the Hollister Ridge have yielded basalts, alkali basalts, hawaiites, picrites and tholeiites as well as granites, which are most likely dropstones transported to the ridge by icebergs. The basalts range from aphyric to porphyric and contain phenocrysts of olivine and plagioclase.

Several mechanisms have been proposed to explain its origin:

- The ridge may be the present-day location of the Louisville hotspot. Petrological differences between the volcanoes formed by this hotspot and the Hollister Ridge make this hypothesis problematic, as are misfits between the reconstructed path of the Louisville hotspot and the position of the Hollister Ridge. Even later plate reconstructions have endorsed this model of origin.
- A "mini-hotspot", which however is not consistent with the geometry of the ridge (which is at an angle to the motion of the Pacific Plate). Such a mini-hotspot may be a branch of the Louisville hotspot.
- Asthenosphere may be flowing from the Louisville hotspot to the Pacific-Antarctic Ridge. Seamounts and aseismic ridges have been observed in other regions of the world where such flow is expected to occur.
- Lineaments in the crust allowed the ascent of magma from the mantle. Such lineaments may be produced by tectonic stresses related to crustal spreading; this theory is supported by the geometry of the Hollister Ridge and the ages of its components. There may be some influence by the Louisville hotspot. Pliocene changes in the plate motion patterns of the region may have generated the lineaments.
- One variation of the "lineament" theory posits that the ridge at first was built by magma ascending through crustal weaknesses; later material from the Louisville hotspot flowed south towards the Hollister Ridge and increasingly interacted with the lineament, thus influencing the composition of the ridge rocks. A change in lithospheric thickness across the Eltanin fracture zone would divert the mantle flow from the Louisville hotspot southward.

== Eruptive history ==
Argon-argon dating has yielded ages ranging from a mean age of 2.531 ± 0.036 million years ago for the western ridge over 0.487 ± 0.03 million years ago and 0.343 ± 0.008 million years ago for the eastern ridge to 91,000 ± 12,000 and 0 years ago for the central ridge. This implies that volcanism is still active at the central ridge, which is also the shallowest sector of the Hollister Ridge.

There is evidence of historical eruptions at the Hollister Ridge. Between 10 March 1991 and 12 June 1992 a strong acoustic swarm was recorded in the southern Pacific Ocean from several stations in French Polynesia and its source identified with a segment of the Hollister Ridge. Anthropogenic and biological origins were considered unlikely sources for the swarm, and it is thus interpreted to be a volcanic swarm. The acoustic swarm may have resulted from the interaction between seawater and a subaqueous lava lake; the acoustic patterns are not consistent with a simple explosive eruption.
