= Bollons Seamount =

Continental fragment seamount southeast of New Zealand

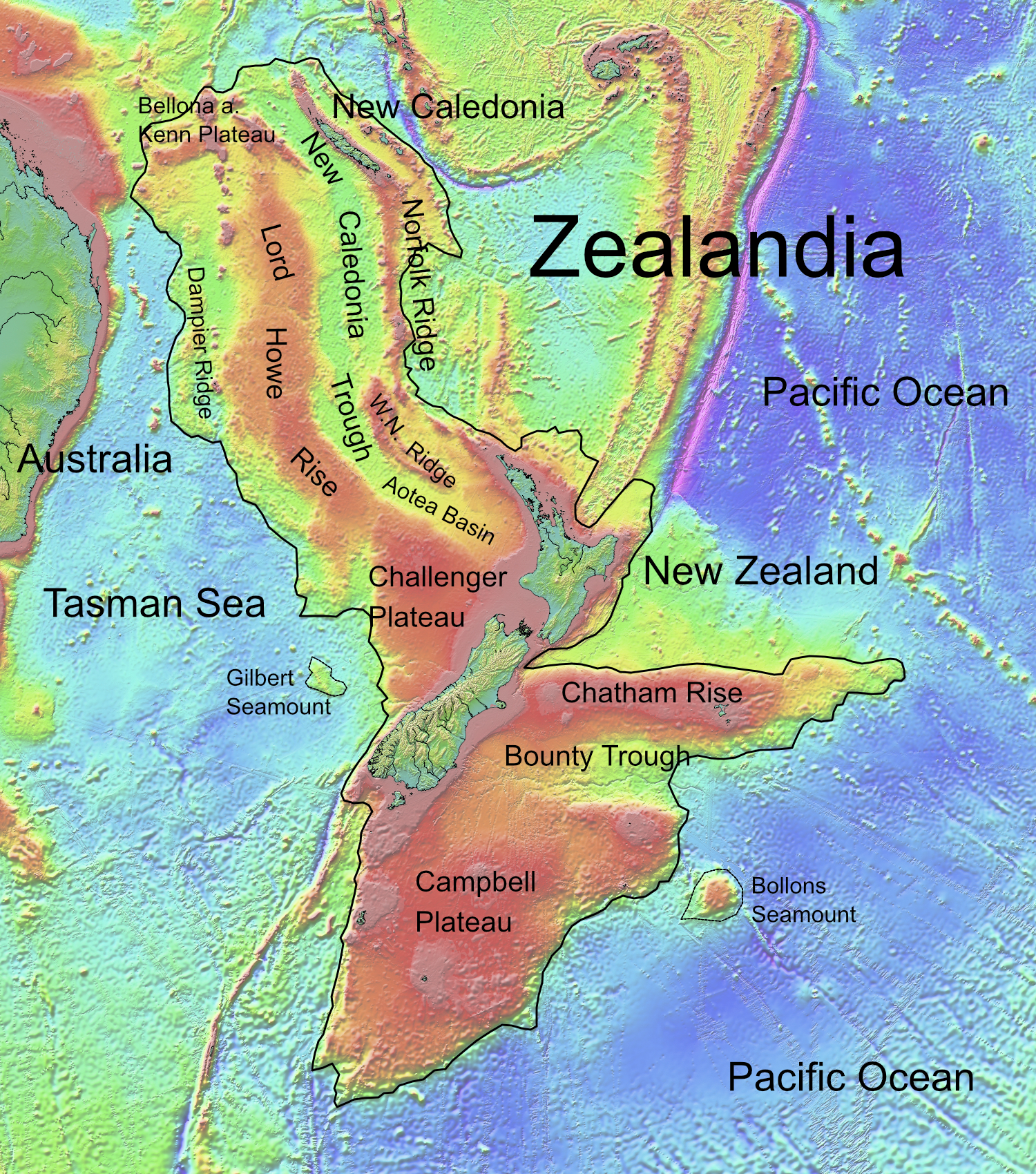
Topographic map of Zealandia, showing Bollons Seamount in the southeast

Bollons Seamount or Bollons Tablemount is a seamount just east of the International Date Line, a few hundred miles off the coast of New Zealand. It represents a continental fragment that separated from Zealandia as a result of rifting. The seamount was involved in a 2002 survey and collection project defined to find the edge of New Zealand's continental shelf. The Bollons Seamount has been shown to be a site of extensive Cretaceous-era rifting in the area towards the southern Chatham Rise between 83.7 and 78.5 MYA.

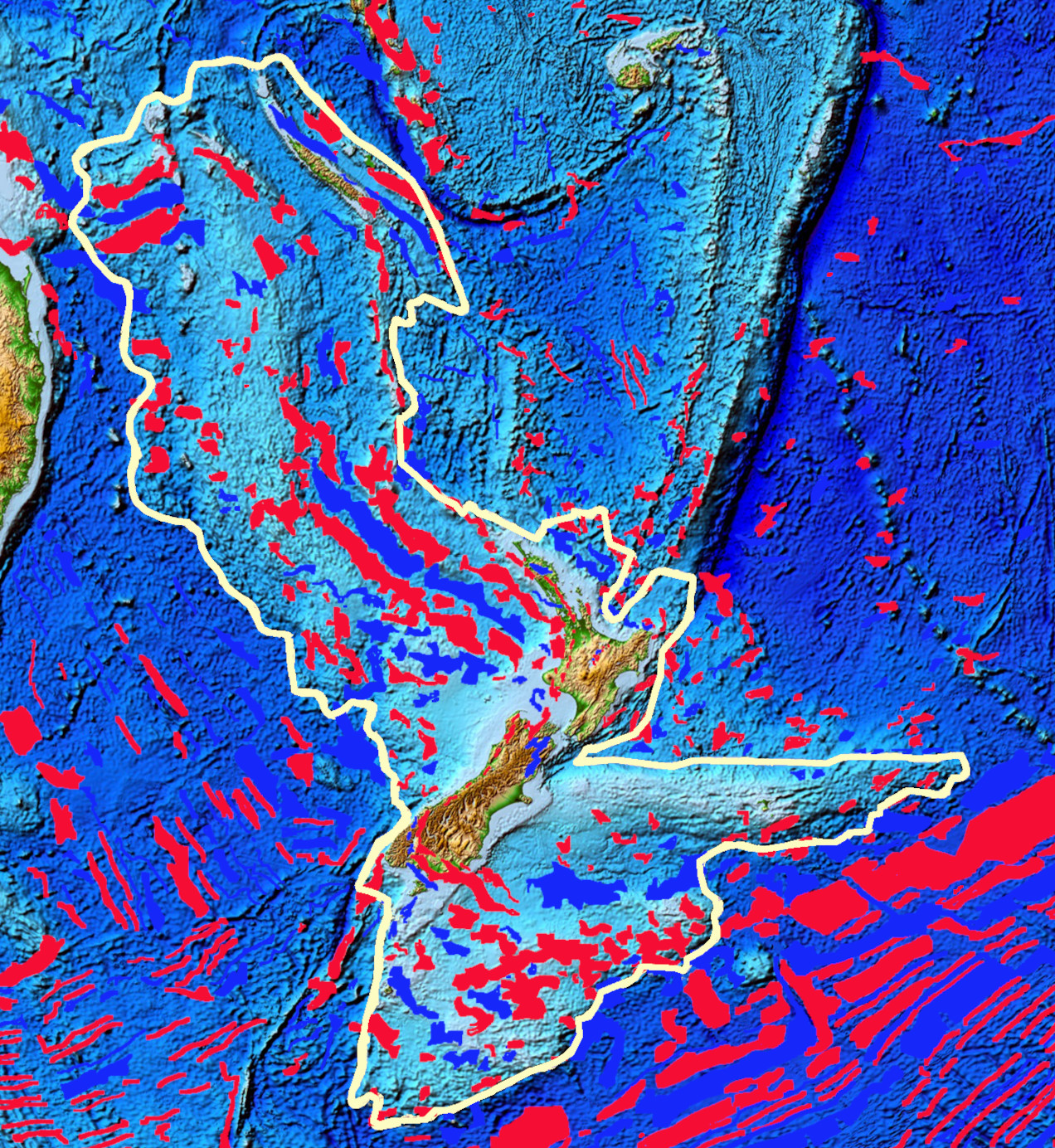
White outline of Zealandia with Bollons Seamount magnetic anomaly identifiable to the south of the Campbell Plateau. Magnetic anomaly is shown as red (field deviation more than 100nT) and blue (field deviation less than -100nT). Outside the confines of Zealandia on the oceanic plates, the effects of sea flow spreading are seen to the south in terms of parallel magnetic anomaly which is disrupted by the Bollons Seamount continental fragment

Magnetic anomalies from the seamount indicate that it was the site of highly irregular activity, with differences in the rifting there being up to 100 km (62 mi). A 50 km (31 mi) gap near the seamount, known as the Ballons gap, is interpreted as being due to excess volcanism from the seafloor spreading process. A ridge just south of the seamount, the Antipodes fracture zone, is interpreted as having been built by a combination of compression and volcanic activity associated with the triple junction Bellingshausen-Marie Byrd Land plate boundary nearby.
