= Chile fracture zone =

Major strike-slip fault and fracture zone on the Antarctic–Nazca plate boundary

Coordinates: 35°32′23.78″S 104°37′3.32″W

Approximate surface projection on oceans of fracture zones is shown.
Key:
- '"`UNIQ--templatestyles-00000000-QINU`"' Fracture zones
- '"`UNIQ--templatestyles-00000001-QINU`"' Probable extension of Fracture zones
- '"`UNIQ--templatestyles-00000002-QINU`"' Fracture zone of relevance to article
- '"`UNIQ--templatestyles-00000003-QINU`"' Probable extension relevant to article
- '"`UNIQ--templatestyles-00000004-QINU`"' Mid-oceanic ridges
- '"`UNIQ--templatestyles-00000005-QINU`"' Sea
- '"`UNIQ--templatestyles-00000006-QINU`"' Land
- Clicking on the rectangle icon enables full window and mouse-over with text detail.'"`UNIQ--ref-00000007-QINU`"'

The Chile fracture zone (CFZ) is a major strike slip fault and fracture zone in the Chile Rise. The Chile Fracture Zone runs in an eastwest direction almost parallel to nearby Juan Fernández Ridge and makes up a large part of the Antarctic—Nazca plate boundary. It was discovered by HMS Challenger

== See also ==
- List of fracture zones
