= Louisville hotspot =

Volcanic hotspot that formed the Louisville Ridge in the southern Pacific Ocean

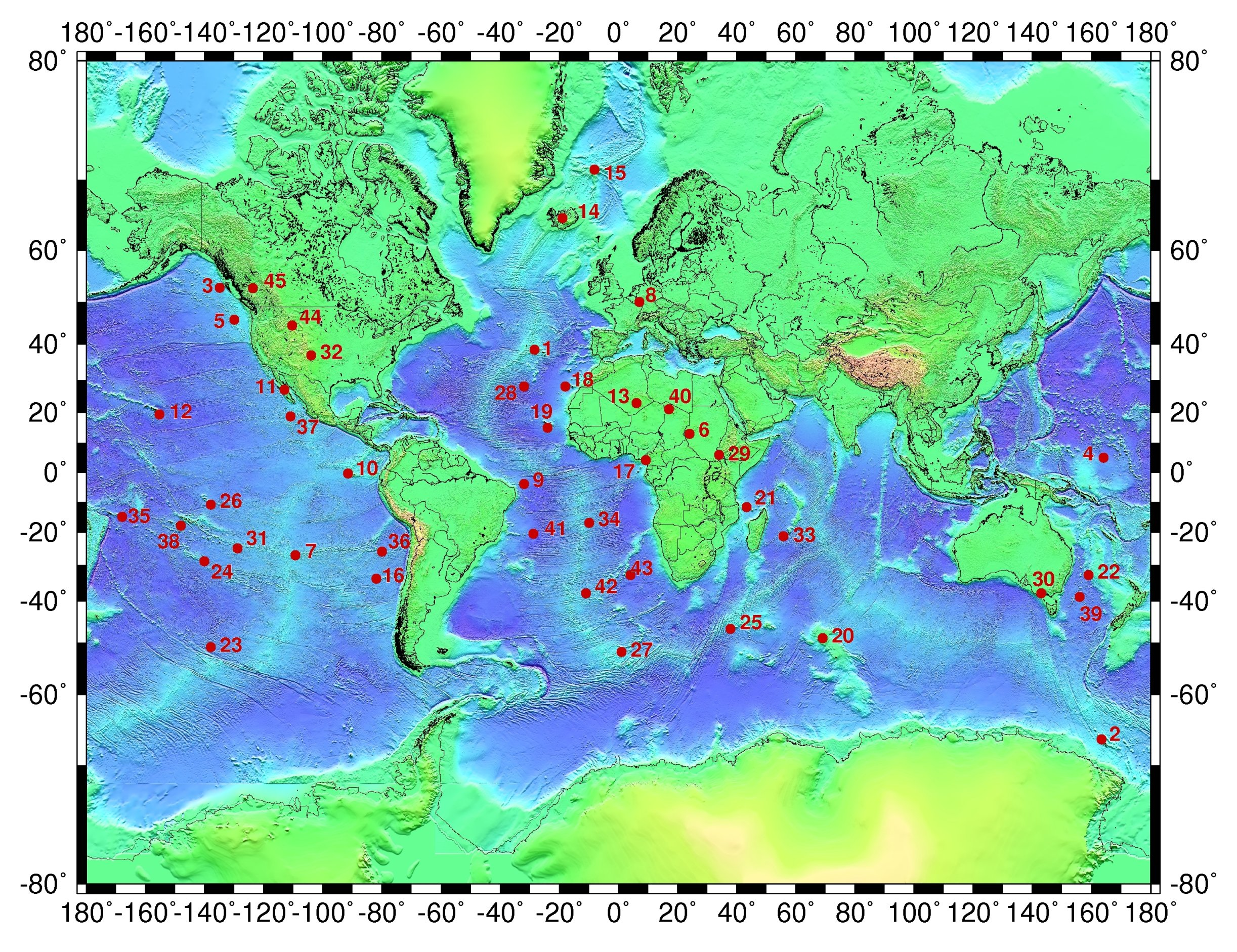
The Louisville hotspot, marked 23 on this map (lower left), is the southernmost one in the Pacific Ocean.

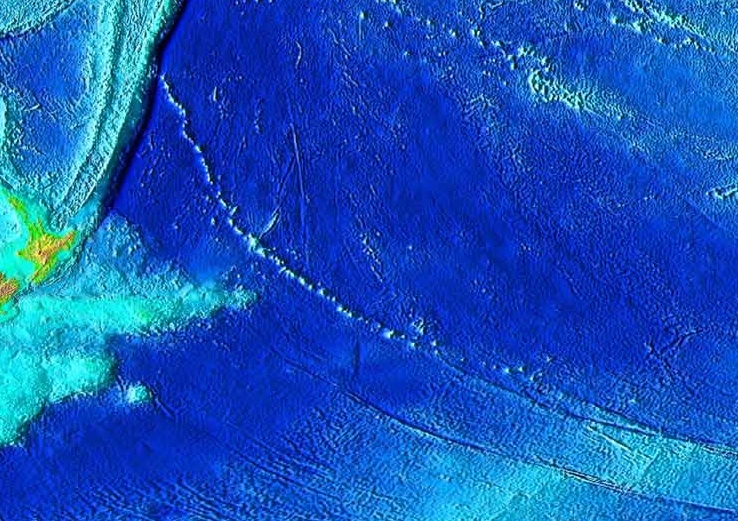
The Louisville Ridge containing the seamount chain stretches diagonally across this bathymetric map of the southwest Pacific Ocean.

The Louisville hotspot is a volcanic hotspot responsible for the volcanic activity that has formed the Louisville Ridge in the southern Pacific Ocean.

== Location ==
The Louisville hotspot is believed to lie close to the Pacific-Antarctic Ridge, although its exact present location is uncertain.

== Geological history ==
The Louisville hotspot has produced the Louisville Ridge, which is one of the longest seamount chains on Earth, stretching some 4,300 km (2,672 mi) from the Pacific-Antarctic Ridge to the Tonga Trench where it subducts under the Indo-Australian Plate as part of the Pacific Plate.

The Louisville hotspot is believed to have been active since at least 78.8 ± 1.3 Ma based on age of the oldest seamount (Osbourn). This duration is comparable to that of the Hawaiian-Emperor seamount chain, although the rate of volcanism at the two chains are relatively different by 50% with volcanic activity at each seamount location being shorter in the Louisville seamounts at about 4 million years compared to more like 6 million years. The Louisville Ridge has a relatively small bend compared to that in the Hawaiian-Emperior chain. During the Early Oligocene period, the Louisville hotspot's magma source rate was much steadier than the Hawaii hotspot rate, and had a lower total volume in eruption. During the Late Oligocene, the magma source decreased to a small fraction of that in the Hawaiian-Emperor seamount chain, such that none of the volcanoes has emerged above sea level in the past 11 million years. The Louisville Ridge is only half as wide as the Hawaiian-Emperior seamount chain. Therefore, unlike the Hawaii hotspot, the Louisville hotspot is believed to have decreased in activity with time.

The Louisville hotspot may have helped create the Ontong Java Plateau, the world's largest oceanic plateau, around 120 million years ago. The modelled locations of the plateau and hotspot at the time do not coincide under one recent plate reconstruction, arguing against this, although other factors mean their linkage may still be possible. One other factor is compositional studies which would suggest that only part of the Ontong Java Plateau that separated quite early is related to the Louisville hotspot. The compositional studies also define that the hot spot magma produces a distinct alkali basalt compared to the eruptives from the Hawaii hotspot.

== See also ==
- Louisville Ridge
- Christmas Island Seamount Province
- Arago hotspot
- Rarotonga hotspot
- Hollister Ridge
- Osbourn Seamount the oldest of the Louisville Ridge
