= Easter fracture zone =

Pacific Ocean plate tectonic feature

The Easter fracture zone is an oceanic fracture zone associated with the transform fault extending from the Tuamotu archipelago in the west to the Peru–Chile Trench to the east.

The Easter fracture zone extends roughly 5900 kilometers from 20°S,131°W to 26°S,78°W. The landscape consists of several ridges and isolated volcanos with maximal peak elevation above the seafloor of 3000m. Because the local seafloor has depths around 4000m to the north of the fracture zone and 3400m to the south of the fracture zone, most of its volcanic peaks form seamounts. They do rise above sea level at the Pitcairn Islands and Easter Island.

== See also ==
- Easter hotspot
