= Pacific–Antarctic Ridge =

Tectonic plate boundary in the South Pacific Ocean

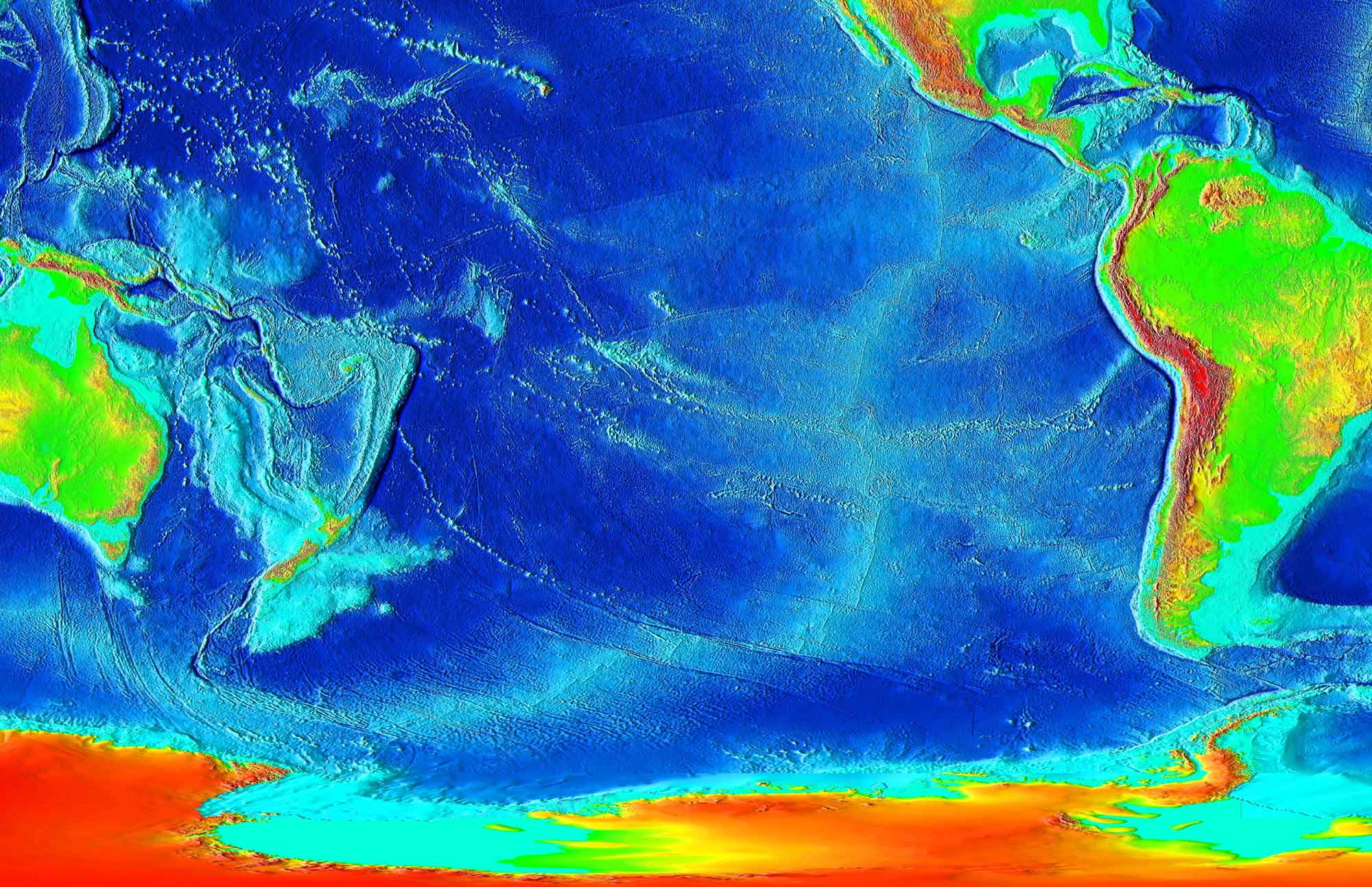
The Pacific-Antarctic Ridge is the southern extension of the East Pacific Rise

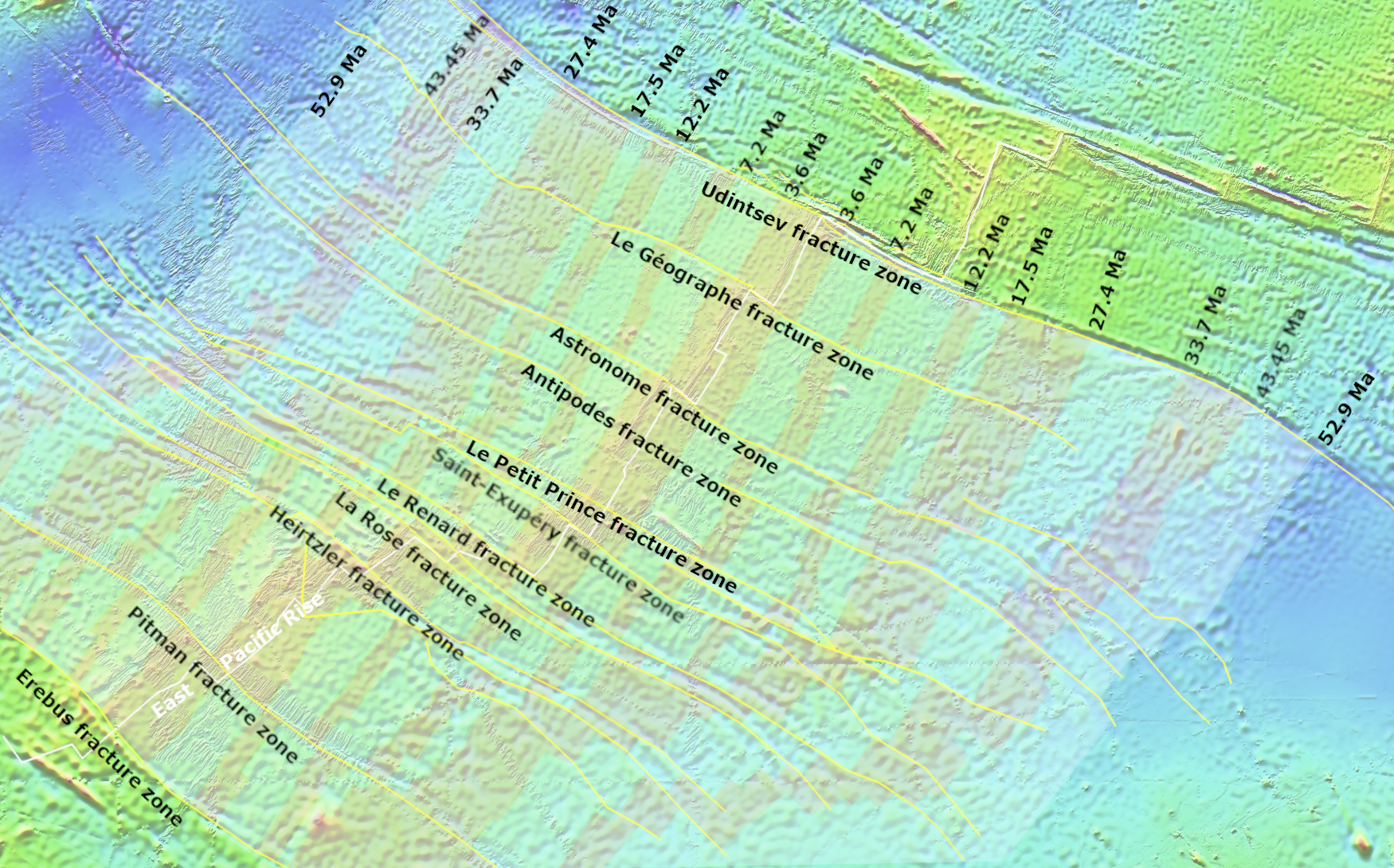
Bathymetric and magnetostratigraphy mapping with ages of sea floor spreading in millions of years (Ma) before present between Erebus and Udintsev fracture zones on the Pacific-Antarctic Ridge

Approximate surface projection on Pacific Ocean of Pacific-Antarctic Ridge.Approximate surface projection on oceans of fracture zones is shown. Key: Fracture zones; Probable extension of Fracture zones; Fracture zone of relevance to article; Probable extension relevant to article; Mid-oceanic ridges; Sea; Land; Clicking on the rectangle icon enables full window and mouse-over with text detail.

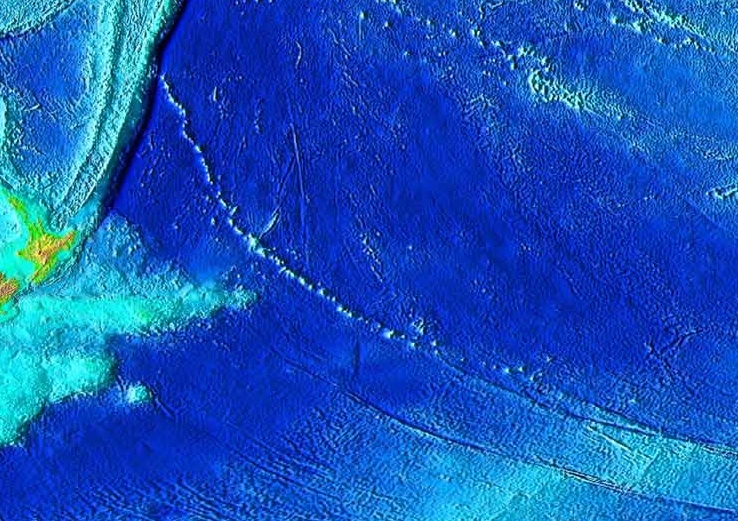
The Louisville Ridge stretches diagonally across this bathymetric map of the southwest Pacific Ocean towards the Pacific-Antarctic Ridge at right bottom

The Pacific-Antarctic Ridge (PAR, Antarctic Pacific Ridge, South Pacific Rise, South Pacific Ridge) is a divergent tectonic plate boundary located on the seafloor of the South Pacific Ocean, separating the Pacific plate from the Antarctic plate. It is regarded as the southern section of the East Pacific Rise in some usages, generally south of the Challenger fracture zone which is associated with a triple junction between the Juan Fernández microplate, the Pacific plate and the Antarctic plate. It stretches from there in a general southwesterly direction to the Macquarie Triple Junction south of New Zealand.

== Tectonics ==
The divergence rate between the two plates along the ridge is believed to vary from about 5.4 centimetres per year (2.1 in/year) near 65°S to 7.4 centimetres per year (2.9 in/year) near the Udintsev fracture zone at 55°S. This area of transition in sea floor spreading rate has been mapped by multiple techniques and occurs near the Heirtzler fracture zone.

The ridge is related to the Late Cretaceous breakup of Gondwana. To the southeast the historic Bellingshausen plate separated the Pacific and Antarctic plates between about 84 to 61 million years ago. Until about 33 million years ago, the Proto-Antipodes fracture zone well to the south separated two independent spreading centers, now merged, being the Antarctic–Pacific Ridge and that of the Antarctic–Campbell Plateau.

=== Fracture zones ===
Fracture zones are generally areas of low gravity on the seafloor parallel to a spreading center. The named fracture zones going southwest along the rise, include:

- Challenger fracture zone
- Menard fracture zone
- Raitt fracture zone
- Heezen fracture zone – northern part of Eltanin fault system which appears continuous to the north with the Louisville Ridge
- Tharp fracture zone – southern part of Eltanin fault system
- George V fracture zone
- Udintsev fracture zone
- Le Géographe fracture zone
- Astronome fracture zone
- Antipodes fracture zone
- Le Petit Prince fracture zone
- Saint-Exupéry fracture zone
- Le Renard fracture zone
- La Rose fracture zone
- Heirtzler fracture zone
  - Endeavour fracture zone (offset from Heirtzler fracture zone poorly defined more recently than about 43.5 Ma – Chron 20)
  - Pahemo fracture zone (not defined more recently than about 43.5 Ma – Chron 20)
- Pitman fracture zone (initiated as an offset of Kohiku and Pahemo fracture zones around 62.5 Ma – Chron 27)
  - Kohiku fracture zone (amalgamates with Pitman more recently than 31 Ma – Chron 12)
- Erebus fracture zone
- Terror fracture zone
- Emerald fracture zone
- Hjort fracture zone

== The Louisville Ridge ==
Stretching for 4,300 km (2,700 mi) north-west from the Eltanin fault system which intersects the Pacific-Antarctic Ridge to the Osbourn Seamount at Tonga and Kermadec Junction is a long line of seamounts called the Louisville Ridge – the longest such chain in the Pacific – thought to have formed from the Pacific Plate sliding over a long-lived center of upwelling magma called the Louisville hotspot.

== See also ==
- Hollister Ridge
- Oceanic ridge
- List of tectonic plate interactions
