= Eltanin fault system =

Series of faults that offset the Pacific-Antarctic Ridge

Approximate surface projection on oceans of fracture zones is shown. Key: Fracture zones; Probable extension of fracture zones; Fracture zone of relevance to article; Probable extension relevant to article; Mid-oceanic ridges; Sea; Land; Clicking on the rectangle icon enables full window and mouse-over with text detail.

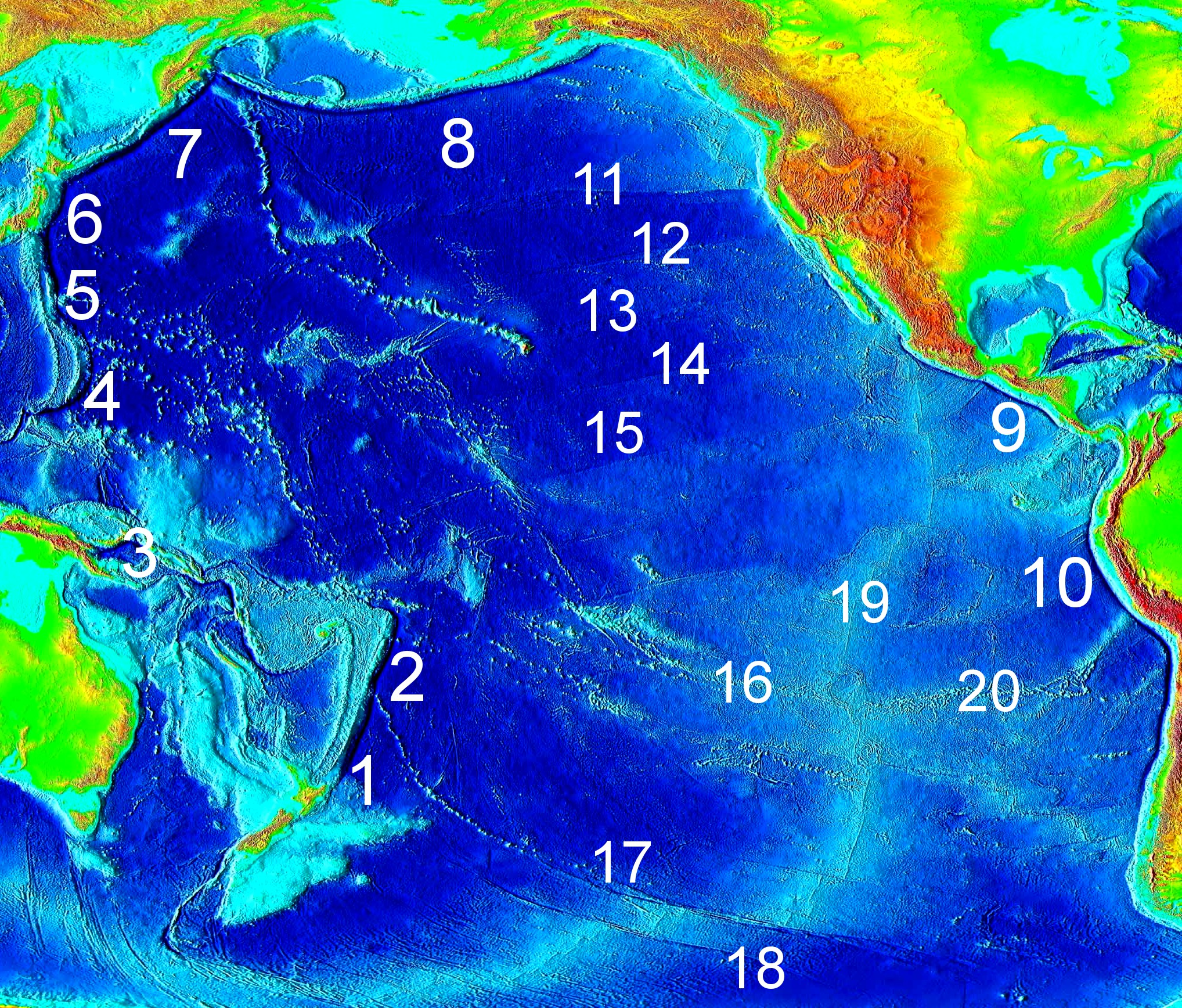
Pacific Ocean depth map showing the Heezen fault and the Tharp fault as #17.

The Eltanin fault system (Eltanin fracture zone) is a series of six or seven dextral transform faults that offset the Pacific-Antarctic Ridge, a spreading zone between the Pacific plate and the Antarctic plate. This is extending by up to 7.93 cm/year (3.12 in/year). It was named after the oceanographic ship USNS Eltanin.

== Description ==
The affected zone of the Pacific-Antarctic Ridge is about 800 km (500 mi) long, between 56° S, 145° W and 54.5° S, 118.5° W, southwest of Easter Island, and about as far as one can get from land on planet Earth (48°52.6′S 123°23.6′W). However, the total offset is about 1600 km. The two major faults in the Eltanin fracture zone are the Heezen transform fault and the Tharp transform fault, usually known as fracture zones as they extend inactively from the Pacific-Antarctic Ridge. A third named after Hollister, which is the shortest to the south, also exists and its active transform region has been linked to the other transform regions of the Eltanin fault system. They are about 1,000 km (620 mi) long and have been in the last 50 years the location of many earthquakes of up to M_{w} 6.4. One segment of the Heezen transform has ruptured with an average repeat interval of 4 years. Other related faults include the Vacquier transform fault, the Menard transform fault, and the Udintsev fault.

To the northwest, in an almost linear fashion as seafloor features, are the Hollister Ridge and the Louisville Seamount Chain.

== See also ==
- Hollister Ridge

== Sources ==
- Sykes, Lynn R.; Ekstörm, Göran (2011). "Earthquakes along Eltanin transform system, SE Pacific Ocean: fault segments characterized by strong and poor seismic coupling and implications for long-term earthquake prediction". Geophysical Journal International. 188 (2): 421–434. Bibcode:2012GeoJI.188..421S. doi:10.1111/j.1365-246X.2011.05284.x.
