= Heirtzler fracture zone =

Undersea fracture zone

Coordinates: 63°30′S 162°30′E

Approximate surface projection on oceans of fracture zones is shown.
Key:
- '"`UNIQ--templatestyles-00000000-QINU`"' Fracture zones
- '"`UNIQ--templatestyles-00000001-QINU`"' Probable extension of Fracture zones
- '"`UNIQ--templatestyles-00000002-QINU`"' Fracture zone of relevance to article
- '"`UNIQ--templatestyles-00000003-QINU`"' Probable extension relevant to article
- '"`UNIQ--templatestyles-00000004-QINU`"' Mid-oceanic ridges
- '"`UNIQ--templatestyles-00000005-QINU`"' Sea
- '"`UNIQ--templatestyles-00000006-QINU`"' Land
- Clicking on the rectangle icon enables full window and mouse-over with text detail.'"`UNIQ--ref-00000007-QINU`"'

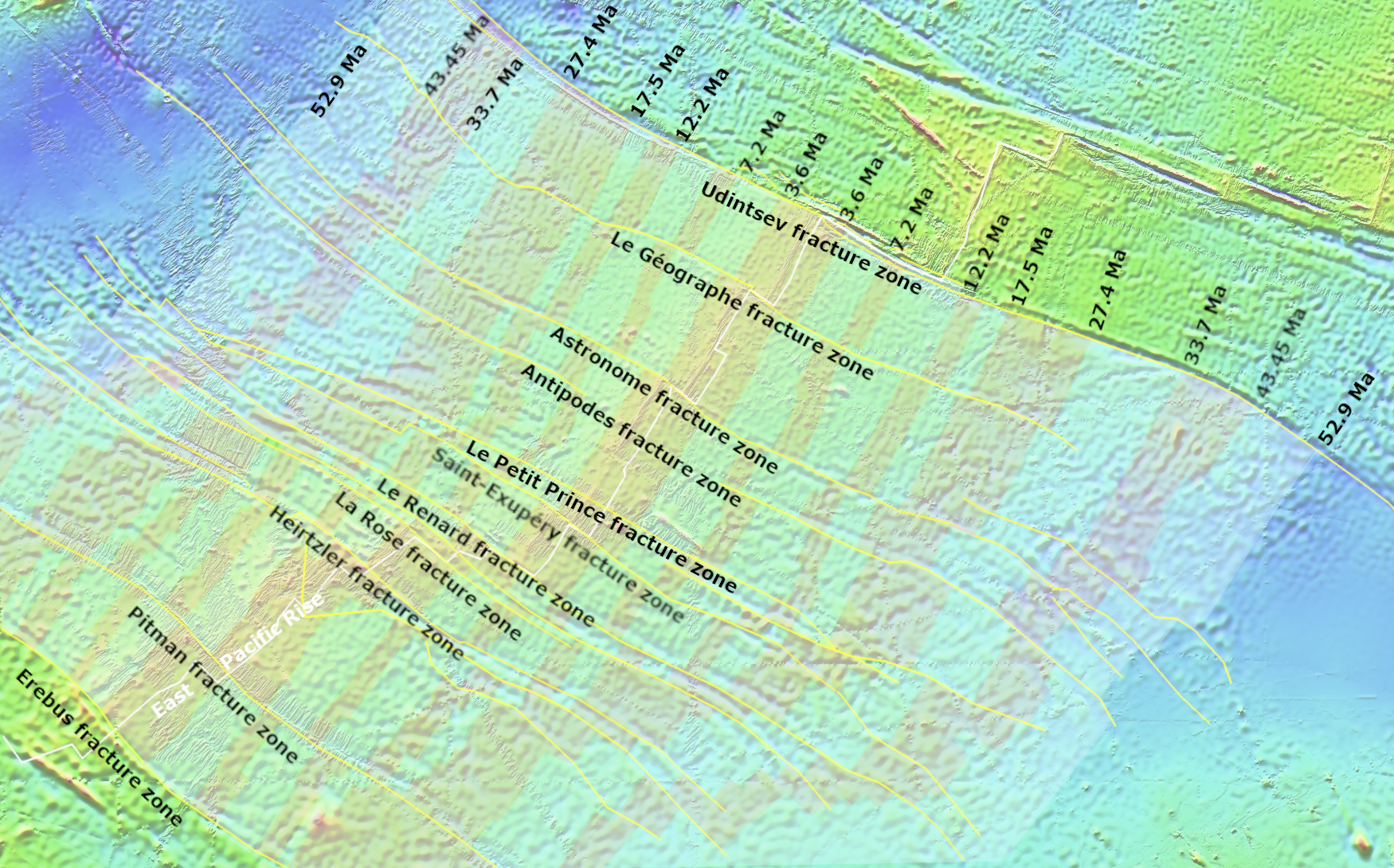
Bathymetric and magnetostratigraphy mapping with ages of sea floor spreading in millions of years (Ma) before present between Erebus and Udintsev fracture zones on the East Pacific Rise

The Heirtzler fracture zone is an undersea fracture zone located south of New Zealand, near Antarctica, that has been estimated to have been a propagator region of the Pacific–Antarctic Ridge for 5–6 million years.

The presumed seismically and tectonically active portion of this fracture zone is known as the Heirtzler transform fault and divides a portion of the Pacific-Antarctic Ridge where spreading rates increase towards its axial north from 56 to 66 mm (2.2 to 2.6 in)/year over a distance of 650 km (400 mi). The Heirtzler transform fault portion has areas of gravity highs, and as well as its larger propagating region, it has to the southeast a smaller Pacific-Antarctic Ridge propagator that may have started about one million years ago, with both associated with clockwise changes in spreading direction.

The feature was named for James R. Heirtzler, a geophysicist who was a pioneer in geomagnetics studies. The name was proposed by the Lamont–Doherty Geological Observatory (now the Lamont–Doherty Earth Observatory), and was approved by the Advisory Committee on Undersea Features in 1993.
