= Antipodes fracture zone =

Undersea fracture zone named in association with Antipodes Island

The Antipodes fracture zone (60°S 151°W) is an undersea fracture zone named in association with Antipodes Island. The name was proposed by Dr. Steven C. Cande of the Scripps Institution of Oceanography, and approved by the Advisory Committee on Undersea Features in September 1997.
