= Yury Dubinin =

Yury Dubinin may refer to:

- Yuri Dubinin (1930–2013), Soviet diplomat and ambassador to the United States 1986–1990
- Yury Dubinin (wrestler) (born 1976), Olympic wrestler from Belarus
- Yury Dubinin (speedway rider), Soviet Union speedway rider
