= Ministry of Internal Affairs (Republic of Karelia) =

Karelia Republic's Ministry of Internal Affairs Министерство внутренних дел по Республике Карелия
- Abbreviation: МВД России по Республике Карелия
- Motto: служа закону, Служим народу by serving the law, we serve the people

Jurisdictional structure
- Operations jurisdiction: RUS
- Legal jurisdiction: Republic of Karelia
- Governing body: MVD
- General nature: Local civilian police

Operational structure
- Headquarters: Petrozavodsk
- Elected officer responsible: Vasily Kukushkin, Internal Minister
- Parent agency: MVD
- Child agency: Politsiya
- Units: List: Criminal Investigative Department; Federal Migatory Service; Traffic Police; OMON Special Force; Air Division

Website
- Official Website

Ministry for Internal Affairs of the Republic of Karelia (Министерство внутренних дел по Республике Карелия) is the main law enforcement organ in the Republic of Karelia in Russia. Subordinated directly to the Russian Interior Ministry and the President of Karelia.

The MVD of Karelia is the territorial policing body in the Russian Karelia. They are also responsible for immigration issue in the territory.

According to the new law "On the Police" ("О полиции") from February 7, 2011 and in the internal issue of the Federal MVD from April 27, 2011.

The Main tasks are:

- Secure the Life, Rights, the freedom of the Citizen of Russia
- fighting against crimes, secure the public order in the Republic of Karelia

== History ==
- September 5, 1923 - The Ministry for Internal Affairs of the Republic of Karelia
- July 3, 1936 - The local Traffic Police was established
- March 16, 1937 - Establishment of the Unit for Economic crimes of the Karelia's Internal Ministry
- April 6, 1963 - The Investigations Department was formed
- May 19, 1969 - Unit for Special Training of the Spetsnaz
- June 14, 1992 - The local Migratory Service was formed
- August 7, 2001 - Formation of the Information and Operative Department of the Criminal Militsiya
