= Nikolai Dubinin =

Nikolai Dubinin may refer to:

- Nicolai Dubinin (born 1973), Russian Roman Catholic prelate
- Nikolay Dubinin (1907–1988), Russian biologist and academician
