= Eltanin Antenna =

Object photographed on the sea floor

Coordinates: 59.116667°S 105.050000°W

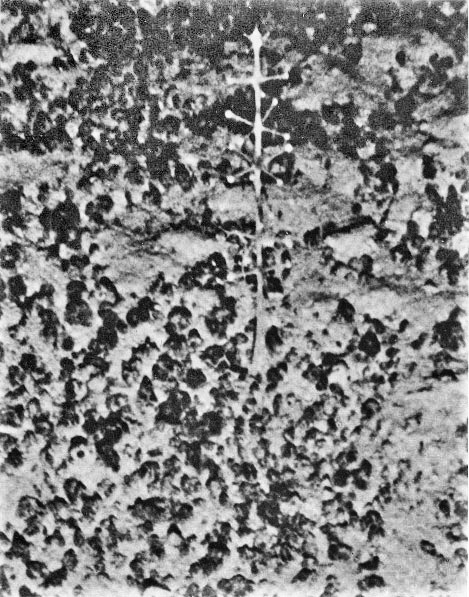
USNS Eltanin photo (1964)

The Eltanin Antenna is an object photographed on the sea floor by the Antarctic oceanographic research ship USNS Eltanin in 1964, while photographing the sea bottom west of Cape Horn.

Due to its regular antenna-like structure and upright position on the seafloor at a depth of 3,904 metres (12,808 ft), some proponents of fringe and UFO-related theories including Bruce Cathie have suggested that it might be an extraterrestrial artifact. It has since been identified as the carnivorous sponge Chondrocladia concrescens (formerly Cladorhiza concrescens).

== History ==
The 1,850-ton–displacement vessel Eltanin was originally launched in 1957, and served with the United States Navy as a cargo-carrying icebreaker. In 1962, she was reclassified as an Oceanographic Research Ship and became the world's first dedicated Antarctic research vessel, a role she filled until 1975.

On 29 August 1964, while taking sample cores and photographing the seabed west of Cape Horn, South America, the Eltanin took the photograph reproduced in this article, at position 59°07'S 105°03'W, at a depth of 3,904 metres (12,808 ft).

The first public mention of the unusual subject of the photograph was a news item which appeared in the New Zealand Herald on 5 December 1964, under the heading "Puzzle Picture From Sea Bed". In 1968, author Brad Steiger wrote an article for Saga Magazine, in which he claimed that the Eltanin had photographed "an astonishing piece of machinery ... very much like the cross between a TV antenna and a telemetry antenna".

== Identification as sponge ==
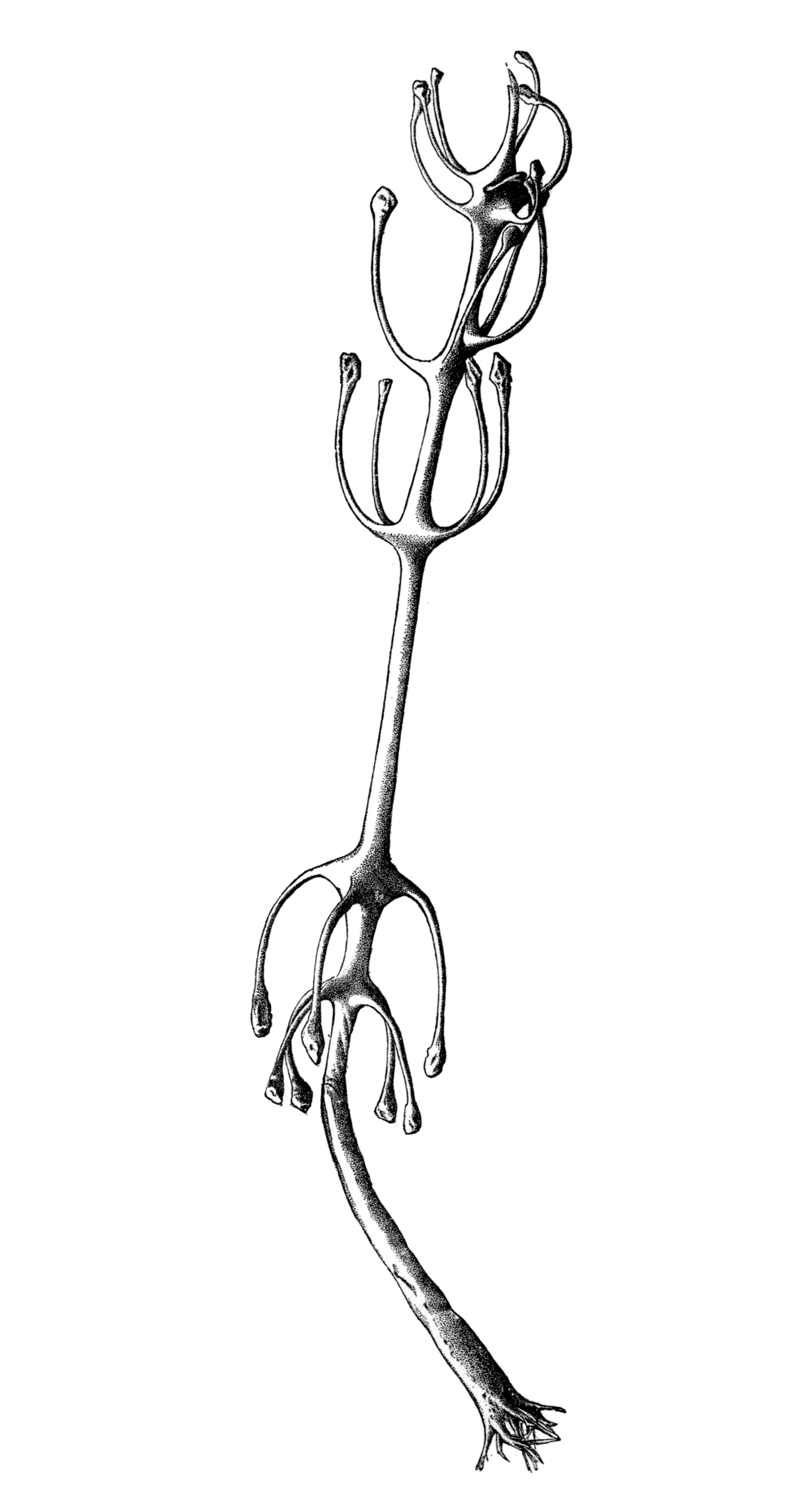
Illustration of Cladorhiza concrescens by Agassiz (1888).

In 1971, the object was identified as Chondrocladia concrescens, a species of carnivorous sponge, by Bruce C. Heezen and Charles D. Hollister in their book The Face of the Deep. The book reproduces the photograph taken by the USNS Eltanin as well as a redrawn version of a drawing by Alexander Agassiz which originally appeared in his 1888 Three Cruises of the Blake. Hollister and Heezen describe Cladorhiza concrescens as a sponge which "somewhat resembles a space-age microwave antenna", while Agassiz described the sponges as having "a long stem ending in ramifying roots, sunk deeply into the mud. The stem has nodes with four to six club-like appendages. They evidently cover like bushes extensive tracts of the bottom."

The identification was largely unknown outside marine biology circles until 2003, when a discussion of the Eltanin Antenna on a UFO mailing list caused researcher Tom DeMary to contact A. F. Amos, an oceanographer who had been aboard the USNS Eltanin in the 1960s. Amos referred DeMary to the Hezeen and Hollister book for further information, after which DeMary published scans of the sponge drawings online.
