= Hjort fracture zone =

Undersea fracture zone in Antarctica

The Hjort fracture zone (62°S 163°E) is an undersea fracture zone in Antarctica. The name was approved by the Advisory Committee for Undersea Features in December 1971.
