= Vinogradov fracture zone =

Undersea fracture zone in Antarctica

Approximate surface projection on oceans of fracture zones is shown.
Key:
- '"`UNIQ--templatestyles-00000000-QINU`"' Fracture zones
- '"`UNIQ--templatestyles-00000001-QINU`"' Probable extension of Fracture zones
- '"`UNIQ--templatestyles-00000002-QINU`"' Fracture zone of relevance to article
- '"`UNIQ--templatestyles-00000003-QINU`"' Probable extension relevant to article
- '"`UNIQ--templatestyles-00000004-QINU`"' Mid-oceanic ridges
- '"`UNIQ--templatestyles-00000005-QINU`"' Sea
- '"`UNIQ--templatestyles-00000006-QINU`"' Land
- Clicking on the rectangle icon enables full window and mouse-over with text detail.'"`UNIQ--ref-00000007-QINU`"'

Vinogradov fracture zone (60°56′S 29°12′W) is a poorly studied Antarctic undersea fracture zone named for Alexandr Vinogradov, a Russian scientist/geochemist and first director of the Vernadsky Institute of Geochemistry (GEOKHI). The name was proposed by Dr. Galina Agapova of the Geological Institute of the Russian Academy of Sciences, and was approved in September 1997 (ACUF 272). It is located south of the Scotia plate and Antarctic plate boundary. A nearby seafloor feature is the Barsukov Seamount.
