= Kosminskaya fracture zone =

Undersea fracture zone southwest of the South Sandwich Islands

The Kosminskaya fracture zone (61°32′S 30°20′W) is an undersea fracture zone named for Professor Irina Kosminskaya, a Russian scientist specializing in Marine Geophysics and Seismology. The name was proposed by Dr. Galina Agapova of the Geological Institute of the Russian Academy of Sciences, and was approved by the Advisory Committee on Undersea Features in September 1997.
