= Eltanin impact =

Prehistoric asteroid impact in southeast Pacific Ocean

- Location within Atlantic Ocean
- Coordinates: 57°47′S 90°47′W

Impact crater structure
- Confidence: Hypothetical
- Diameter: 35 km (22 mi)
- Impactor diameter: 1–4 km (0.6–2 mi)
- Age: 2.51±0.07 Ma, earliest Pleistocene

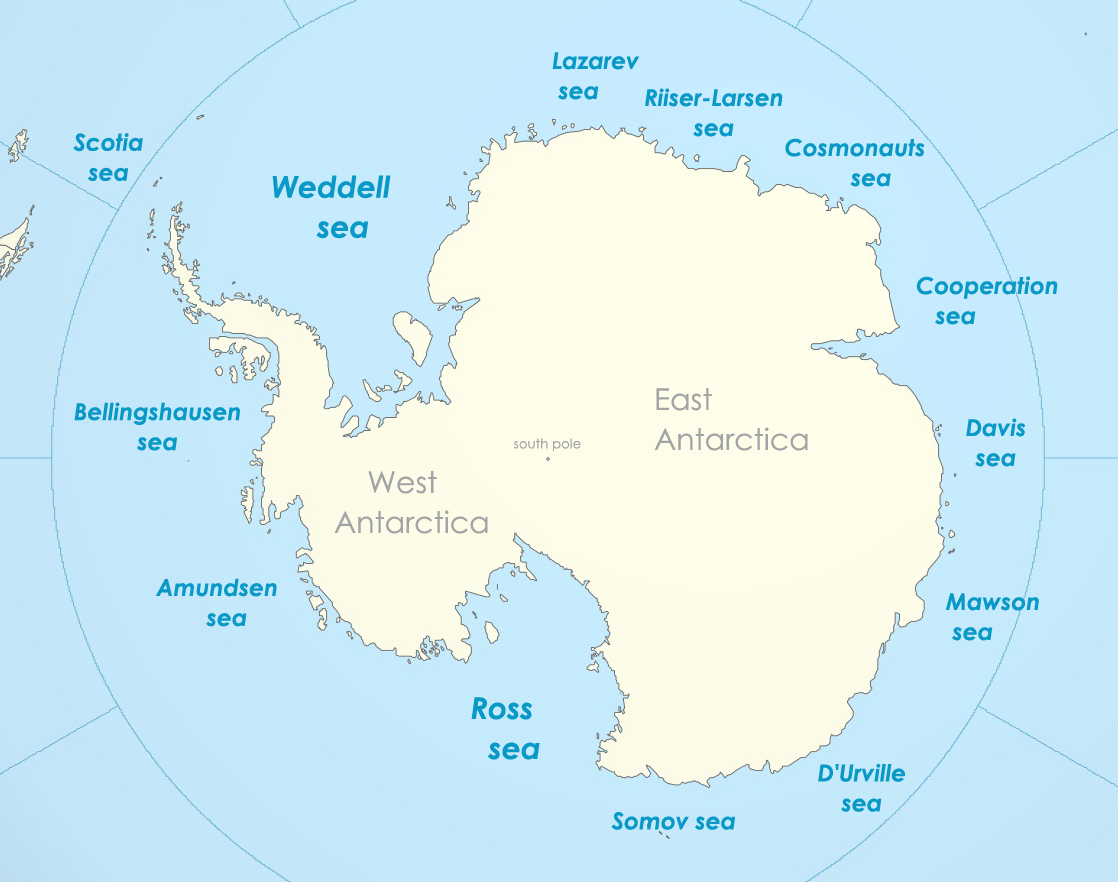
The possible impact site is located at the edge of the Bellingshausen Sea (part of the Southern Ocean)

The Eltanin impact is thought to be an asteroid impact in the eastern part of the South Pacific Ocean that occurred around the Pliocene-Pleistocene boundary approximately 2.51±0.07 million years ago. The impact occurred at the north edge of the Bellingshausen Sea, 1,500 km (950 mi) southwest of Chile, where the sea floor is approximately 4–5 kilometres (2.5–3.1 mi) deep. The asteroid was estimated to be about 1 to 4 km (0.6 to 2.5 mi) in diameter. No crater associated with the impact has been discovered. The impact likely evaporated 150 km^{3} (36 mi^{3}) of water, generating large tsunami waves hundreds of metres high.

== Description ==
The possible impact site was first discovered in 1981 as an iridium anomaly in sediment cores collected by the research vessel Eltanin, which the site and impactor are named after. Later studies were done by the vessel Polarstern. Sediment at the bottom of the 5-kilometre-deep (3.1-mile) ocean in the area had an iridium enrichment, a strong sign of extraterrestrial contamination. Possible debris from the asteroid is spread over an area of 500 km^{2} (190 mi^{2}). Sediments from the Eocene and Paleocene were jumbled and deposited again chaotically. Also mixed in were melted and fragmented meteorite matter. An area near the Freeden Seamounts covering over 20,000 km^{2} (7,700 mi^{2}) has a meteorite material surface density of 10–60 kg/m^{2} (2.0–12.3 lb/ft^{2}). Of this, 87% is melted and 13% only fragmented. This area is the region of the Earth's surface with the highest known density of meteorite material coverage.

The disturbed sediment had three layers. The lowermost layer, SU IV, is a chaotic mixture of crumbled sediments in the form of a breccia. Above this is layer SU III, consisting of layered sand, consistent with having been deposited from turbulently flowing water. Above this is the SU II, with meteorite fragments and graded silt and clay that plausibly settled out of still-but-dirty water.

== Asteroid ==
The supposed impacting body, the Eltanin asteroid, is estimated to have been 1–4 km (0.62–2.5 mi) in diameter and traveling with a speed of 20 km/s (45,000 mph). The possible size of the asteroid was calculated by the amount of iridium found in the disturbed sediments. Assuming that there were 187 parts per billion of iridium in the asteroid, the known distribution of the metal leads to estimates that the body was over 1 km (0.6 mi) in size. Based on a diameter of 1 km, it is estimated it would have left a crater about 35 km (22 mi) across.

The composition of suspected asteroid remnants has been classified as low metal mesosiderites. The bolide explosion would also have produced microspherules under half a millimeter in diameter. Some of these are glass, and others have spinel and pyroxene. Elements enriched include calcium, aluminium, and titanium.

== Tsunami ==
On the shorelines of the Pacific Ocean, there are erosional features that are indicative of a very large tsunami. These include an erosional surface and chaotic deposits of mixed terrestrial and ocean-derived sediment. Boulders as big as buses are mixed with marine fossils and mud. The most well-characterised tsunami deposits are near the coast of Chile. Off the coast of Antarctica, there are mudslides into the deep ocean from this age.

The size of a possible tsunami has been calculated. An asteroid that was 4 km (2.5 mi) in diameter, falling onto the 5-kilometre-deep (3.1-mile) ocean, would have blasted the water off the ocean floor for at least 60 km (37 mi), and made a wave over 200 m (660 ft) high on the southern end of Chile and the Antarctic Peninsula. After ten hours, waves around 35 m (115 ft) would reach Tasmania, Fiji, and Central America, and the east coast of New Zealand would have been washed with 60-metre-high (200-foot) waves. If the impact object was 1 km (0.6 mi) in diameter, then the wave heights would have been one-fifth as great.

== Ice age trigger ==
At the time of the impact in the Late Pliocene, the Earth was cooling. The impact and disruption to the weather could have triggered the start of ice-cap formation in the Northern Hemisphere. The impact would have put a large amount of water and salt into the atmosphere, disrupted ice shelves, depleted the ozone layer, caused surface acidification, and increased the Earth's albedo.

== See also ==
- Karakul crater – a large impact crater which may be just a few million years older than Eltanin
- List of possible impact structures on Earth
- Megatsunami of Ranquil Formation – Miocene and Pliocene sedimentary formation in south-central Chile
