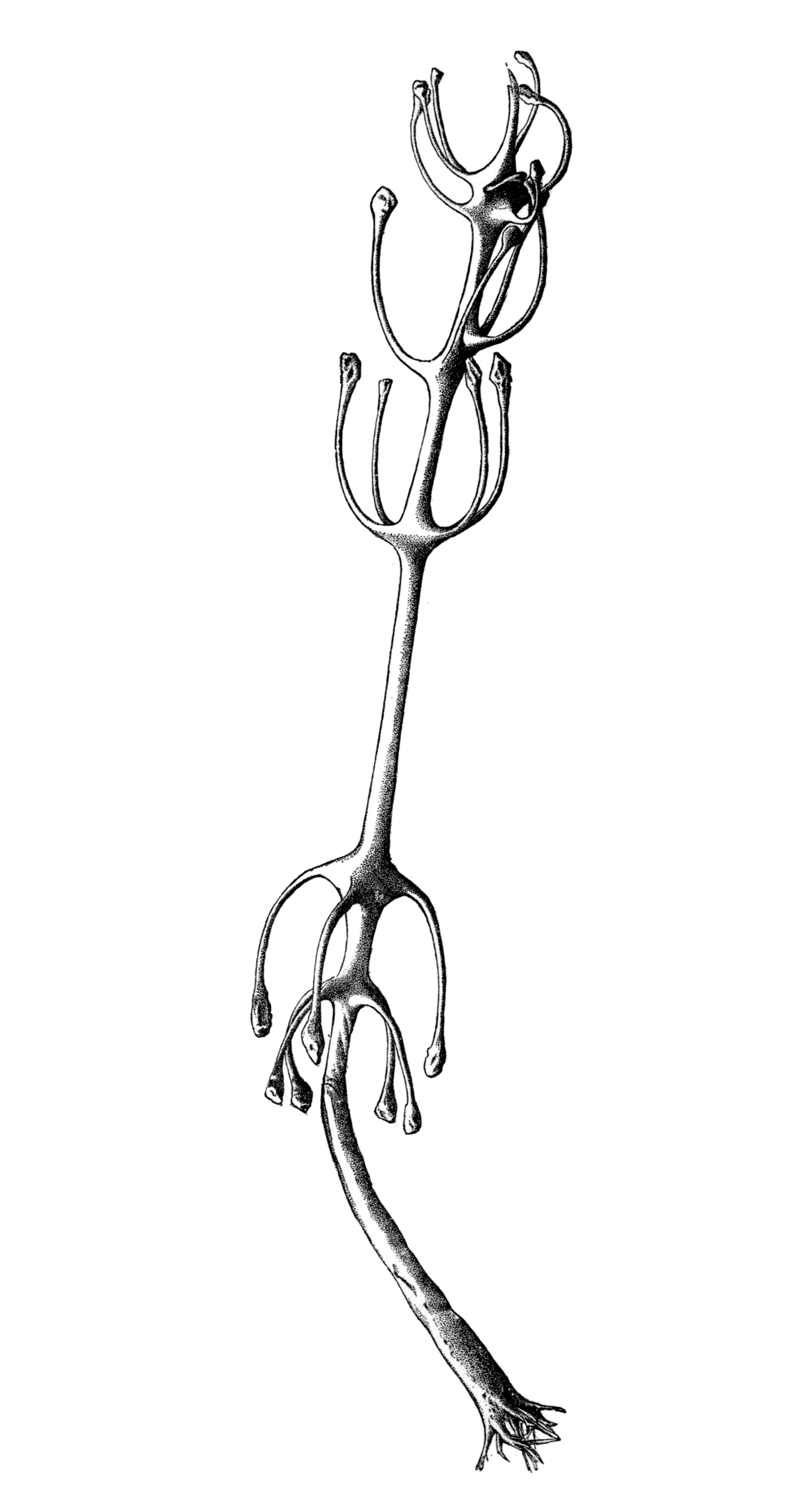
- 1888 illustration by Agassiz

Scientific classification
- Kingdom: Animalia
- Phylum: Porifera
- Class: Demospongiae
- Order: Poecilosclerida
- Family: Cladorhizidae
- Genus: Chondrocladia
- Subgenus: Chondrocladia
- Species: C. concrescens

Binomial name
- Chondrocladia concrescens (Schmidt, 1880)

Synonyms
- Cladorhiza concrescens Schmidt, 1880

= Chondrocladia concrescens =

Species of sponge

Chondrocladia concrescens (formerly Cladorhiza concrescens) is a species of deep-sea carnivorous sponge in the family Cladorhizidae. It is commonly known as the "ping pong tree sponge".

== Description ==
Alexander Agassiz described the sea sponge as "a long stem ending in ramifying roots, sunk deeply into the mud. The stem has nodes with four to six club-like appendages".

== See also ==
- Cladorhizidae
- Eltanin Antenna
- Sponge
