= Pitman fracture zone =

Undersea fracture zone in the Southern Ocean

Coordinates: 64°30′S 170°0′W

Pitman fracture zone is an undersea fracture zone named for Dr. Walter C. Pitman III, a geophysicist and pioneer in studies of continental drift and seafloor spreading. Name proposed by Drs. Cande, Haxby and Raymond, Lamont–Doherty Geological Observatory (now Lamont–Doherty Earth Observatory); name approved 3/93 (ACUF 256).
