= Artistic Gymnastics World Cup – Women's balance beam =

Women's events at the Artistic Gymnastics World Cup were first held at the 1975 FIG Artistic Gymnastics World Cup.

Three medals are awarded: gold for first place, silver for second place, and bronze for third place. Tie breakers have not been used in every year. In the event of a tie between two gymnasts, both names are listed, and the following position (second for a tie for first, third for a tie for second) is left empty because a medal was not awarded for that position. If three gymnastics tied for a position, the following two positions are left empty.

== Medalists ==
Year	Location	Gold	Silver	Bronze
1975	(United Kingdom) London	(Soviet Union) Ludmilla Tourischeva	(Hungary) Márta Egervári	(Soviet Union) Elvira Saadi
1977	(Spain) Oviedo	(Soviet Union) Elena Mukhina	(East Germany) Steffi Kräker	(Romania) Anca Grigoraș
1978	(Brazil) São Paulo	(Czechoslovakia) Vera Cerna	(Soviet Union) Natalia Shaposhnikova	(Soviet Union) Svetlana Agapova
1979	(Japan) Tokyo	(Romania) Emilia Eberle	(Romania) Nadia Comăneci	(Soviet Union) Nellie Kim (East Germany) Steffi Kräker
1980	(Canada) Toronto	(Soviet Union) Elena Naimushina	(Czechoslovakia) Radka Zemanova (Soviet Union) Maria Filatova	-
1982	(Socialist Federal Republic of Yugoslavia) Zagreb	(Soviet Union) Natalia Yurchenko	(China) Wu Jiani	(Soviet Union) Olga Bicherova
1986	(China) Beijing	(Soviet Union) Oksana Omelianchik	(Romania) Daniela Silivaş	(Soviet Union) Elena Shushunova
1990	(Belgium) Brussels	(China) Yang Bo	(China) Li Li	(Romania) Cristina Bontaș
1998	(Japan) Sabae	(China) Liu Xuan	(China) Kui Yuanyuan	(Romania) Gina Gogean
2000	(United Kingdom) Glasgow	(Romania) Andreea Răducan	(Romania) Simona Amânar	(China) Ling Jie
2002	(Germany) Stuttgart	(China) Sun Xiaojiao	(Russia) Elena Zamolodchikova	(Uzbekistan) Oksana Chusovitina
2004	(United Kingdom) Birmingham	(Romania) Cătălina Ponor	(China) Li Ya (Romania) Alexandra Eremia	-
2006	(Brazil) São Paulo	(China) Li Ya	(Brazil) Daniele Hypólito	(Spain) Lenika de Simone
2008	(Spain) Madrid	(Australia) Lauren Mitchell	(Russia) Yulia Lozhechko	(China) Li Shanshan
