= Lazarev Trough =

Undersea trough off the coast of Antarctica

The Lazarev Trough (65°35′S 130°0′E) is an undersea trough off the coast of Antarctica. It was named for the Russian polar explorer Admiral Mikhail P. Lazarev, commanding officer of the sloop Mirnyy during the Bellingshausen expedition of 1819–1821. The name, proposed by G. Agapova of the Geological Institute of the Russian Academy of Sciences, was approved by the Advisory Committee for Undersea Features in August 1985.
