= Dubinin Trough =

The Dubinin Trough (67°10′S 80°30′E) is an undersea trough off of the coast of Antarctica in the Cooperation Sea named for Soviet Captain A.I. Dubinin, leader of the 1957 Antarctic expedition. That name was proposed by G. Agapova of the Geological Institute of the Russian Academy of Sciences, and was approved by the Advisory Committee for Undersea Features in August 1985. The nearest inhabited area is Davis Station.
