= USNS Eltanin =

Cargo ship of the United States Navy

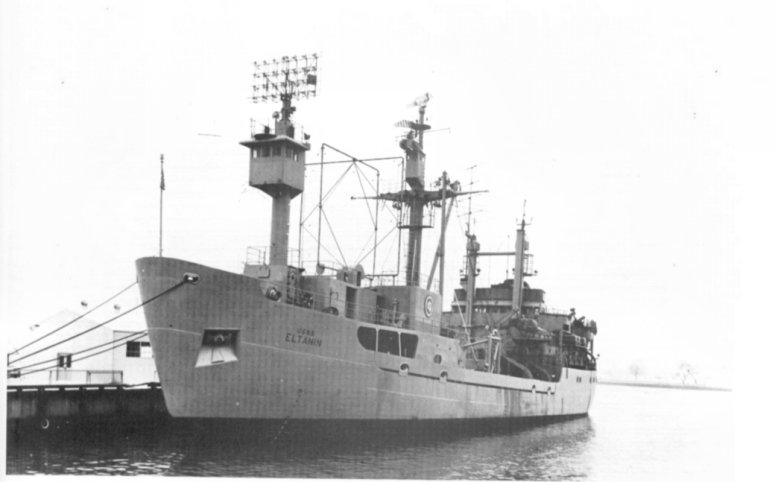

History

United States
- Name: USS Eltanin
- Namesake: A star in the constellation Draco
- Builder: Avondale Marine Ways, Inc., Avondale, Louisiana
- Laid down: date unknown as type (C1-ME2-13a) hull
- Launched: 16 January 1957
- Acquired: by the U.S. Navy, October 1957
- In service: October 1957 by MSTS as USNS Eltanin (T-AK-270)
- Out of service: date unknown
- Reclassified: Oceanographic Research Vessel (T-AGOR-8), 23 August 1962
- Stricken: not known
- Fate: transferred to Argentina in 1974

History

Argentina
- Name: ARA Islas Orcadas
- Acquired: 1974
- Fate: Scrapped, 1979

General characteristics
- Type: cargo ship (icebreaker)
- Tonnage: 1,850 tons
- Displacement: 3,886 tons
- Length: 266 ft (81 m)
- Beam: 52 ft (16 m)
- Draft: 18 ft (5.5 m)
- Propulsion: diesel electric, two shafts, 3,200hp
- Speed: 13 knots
- Complement: 18 civilians, 15 scientific party, 6 Navy
- Armament: none indicated

USNS Eltanin (T-AK-270/T-AGOR-8) was an Eltanin-class cargo ship with an ice-breaking hull acquired by the U.S. Navy in 1957 and then operated by the Navy in a non-commissioned status, named after Eltanin, a star in the constellation Draco. Her designation was changed to that of an oceanographic research ship in 1962 when she operated in Antarctic waters.

== Construction ==
Eltanin (T-AK-270) was launched on 16 January 1957 by Avondale Marine Ways, Inc., Avondale, Louisiana. She was turned over to the Military Sea Transportation Service (MSTS) in October 1957 for operation in a noncommissioned status.

== Conversion to research ship ==
During 1961 and 1962, Eltanin was modified throughout at a New York shipyard to fill a new role as a floating laboratory. Former cargo spaces were replaced with labs, workshops, and staterooms for scientists, and further labs were added above decks. Anti-roll tanks were also added, along with protective bulwarks. On 23 August 1962 her classification was changed to Oceanographic Research Vessel and designated T-AGOR-8.

== Antarctic duty ==
Eltanin was assigned to the National Science Foundation to support the Foundation's Antarctic Research Program with the ship operated by the Military Sea Transportation Service. The ship worked in the Antarctic Ocean becoming the first Antarctic research ship to do so. After two shakedown cruises in the Atlantic Ocean and a positioning cruise with further testing en route, Eltanin operated a total of 52 Antarctic research cruises from July 5, 1962 thru December 29, 1972. Over this time, some 80% of the southern ocean was surveyed, and a total of 400,000 miles traveled.

Some of Eltanin's research cruises collected magnetic profiles of the sea floor that proved to be pivotal evidence in the acceptance of the continental drift theory, by proving the existence of sea floor spreading. These key profiles, which show symmetric bands of alternating magnetic orientation (corresponding to magnetic pole reversals) around various undersea ridges, are known by the ship's name and cruise number (ex. Eltanin-19).

As of mid-1973, Eltanin was laid up in San Francisco Bay, her research career at an end.

== Argentine Navy service ==
In 1974 she was transferred to the Argentine Navy in a 5-year lease and renamed ARA Islas Orcadas.

In 1978 she participated in an expedition in the Weddell Sea during which its crew discovered an igneous underwater formation, baptized Virginia Range.

At the end of the lease period it was returned to the US Navy in Norfolk, Virginia, on 1 August 1979.

== Inactivation ==
Eltanin was placed out of service at an unknown date and struck from the Naval Vessel Register, also at an unknown date, and transferred to the U.S. Maritime Administration for lay up in the National Defense Reserve Fleet.

Eltanin was returned by Argentina in early 1990. USS Eltanin was laid up, pending title transfer for disposal, in the James River anchorage of the National Defense Reserve Fleet (NDRF), on February 21, 1990. The U.S. Navy officially passed title of the vessel to the Maritime Administration on July 2 of that year. MARAD sold Eltanin for scrap on November 22, 1991, and it departed the reserve fleet on March 18, 1992.

== See also ==
- United States Antarctic Program
- Eltanin Antenna
- Eltanin impact
- Hollister Ridge
