= Fracture zone =

Linear feature on the ocean floor

Approximate surface projection on oceans of fracture zones is shown. Key: Fracture zones; Probable extension of fracture zones; Fracture zone of relevance to article; Probable extension relevant to article; Mid-oceanic ridges; Sea; Land; Clicking on the rectangle icon enables full window and mouse-over with text detail.

A fracture zone is a linear feature on the ocean floor—often hundreds, even thousands of kilometers long—resulting from the action of offset mid-ocean ridge axis segments. They are a consequence of plate tectonics. Lithospheric plates on either side of an active transform fault move in opposite directions, resulting in strike-slip activity. Fracture zones extend past the transform faults, away from the ridge axis; are usually seismically inactive (because both plate segments are moving in the same direction), although they can display evidence of transform fault activity, primarily in the different ages of the crust on opposite sides of the zone. Fracture zones also experience tectonic uplift on ridge walls, both within the ridge area and beyond the fracture area.

In actual usage, many transform faults aligned with fracture zones are often loosely referred to as "fracture zones" although technically, they are not. They can be associated with other tectonic features and may be subducted or distorted by later tectonic activity. They are usually defined with bathymetric, gravity and magnetic studies.

== Structure and formation ==
Mid-ocean ridges are divergent plate boundaries. As the plates on either side of an offset mid-ocean ridge move, a transform fault forms at the offset between the two ridges.

Fracture zones and the transform faults that form them are separate but related features. Transform faults are plate boundaries, meaning that on either side of the fault is a different plate. In contrast, outside of the ridge-ridge transform fault, the crust on both sides belongs to the same plate, and there is no relative motion along the junction. The fracture zone is thus the junction between oceanic crustal regions of different ages. Because younger crust is generally higher due to increased thermal buoyancy, the fracture zone is characterized by an offset in elevation with an intervening canyon that may be topographically distinct for hundreds or thousands of kilometers on the sea floor.

== Fracture wall uplift ==
Across many fracture zones there exists topographically high ridges, most commonly running along the same axis as the actual fracture. These elevated chunks of crust run parallel to the transform boundary, and can extend even beyond the region where transformation is taking place.

There is no one specific factor that is believed to cause the uplift within these regions. Hypothesized causes include heat from the plate motion radiating outward and compression and tension forces working horizontally from the fracture zone. Damage to surrounding ocean crust can vary depending on the location and conditions pertaining to the uplift, with some being purely vertical and some being at angles to the seafloor and fracture axis. This uplift can be at very large scales, even encompassing the fracture zone itself.

There are many regions found across the globe that have significant fracture wall uplift. Such examples found along the Mid-Atlantic Ridge include the region between the TAG Hydrothermal Field and MARK Area, located between 24° and 26° North along the ridge, as well as Vema Fracture Zone, located at approximately 11° North and 42° West along the ridge.

The uplift found in the region between the TAG Hydrothermal Field and MARK Area is distinct, as only one of the two ridge walls experiences any kind of uplift. In comparison to the normal slope, the abnormally uplifted slope rises 1–3 kilometers above the ridge crest, with there being no visible tilting or rotation in the crust that has been displaced. On a similar note, the Vema Fracture Zone has uplifting above the ridge crest, however uplifted crust is severely damaged and has demonstrated a significant loss of hydraulic material.

== Geologic importance ==
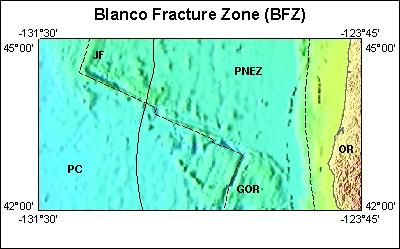
Blanco fracture zone map

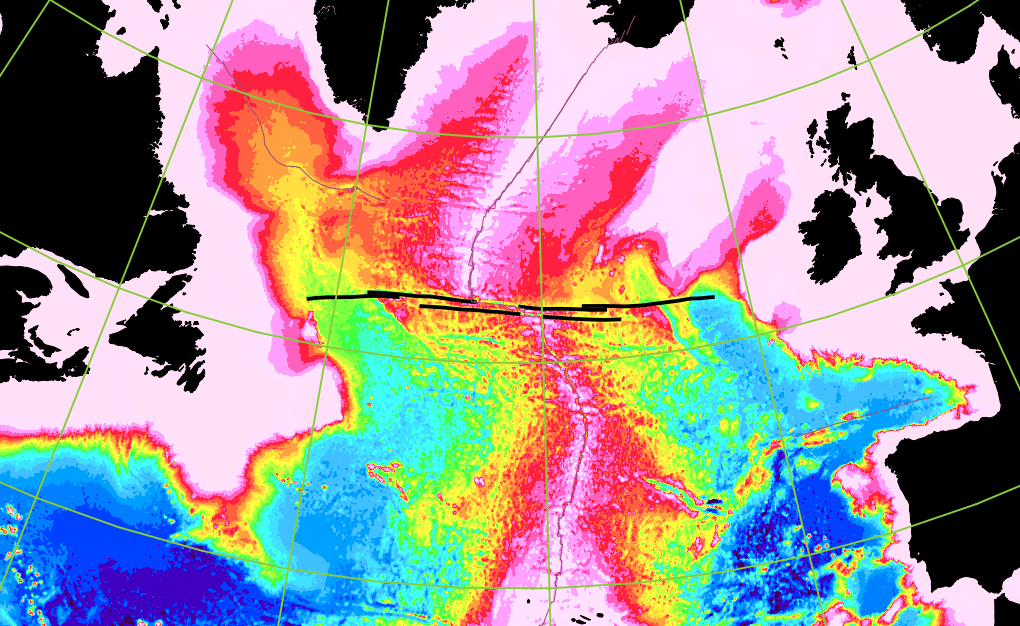
Bathymetry map of the North Atlantic Ocean showing the full extent of the Charlie-Gibbs fracture zone (horizontal black lines in the center of the image)

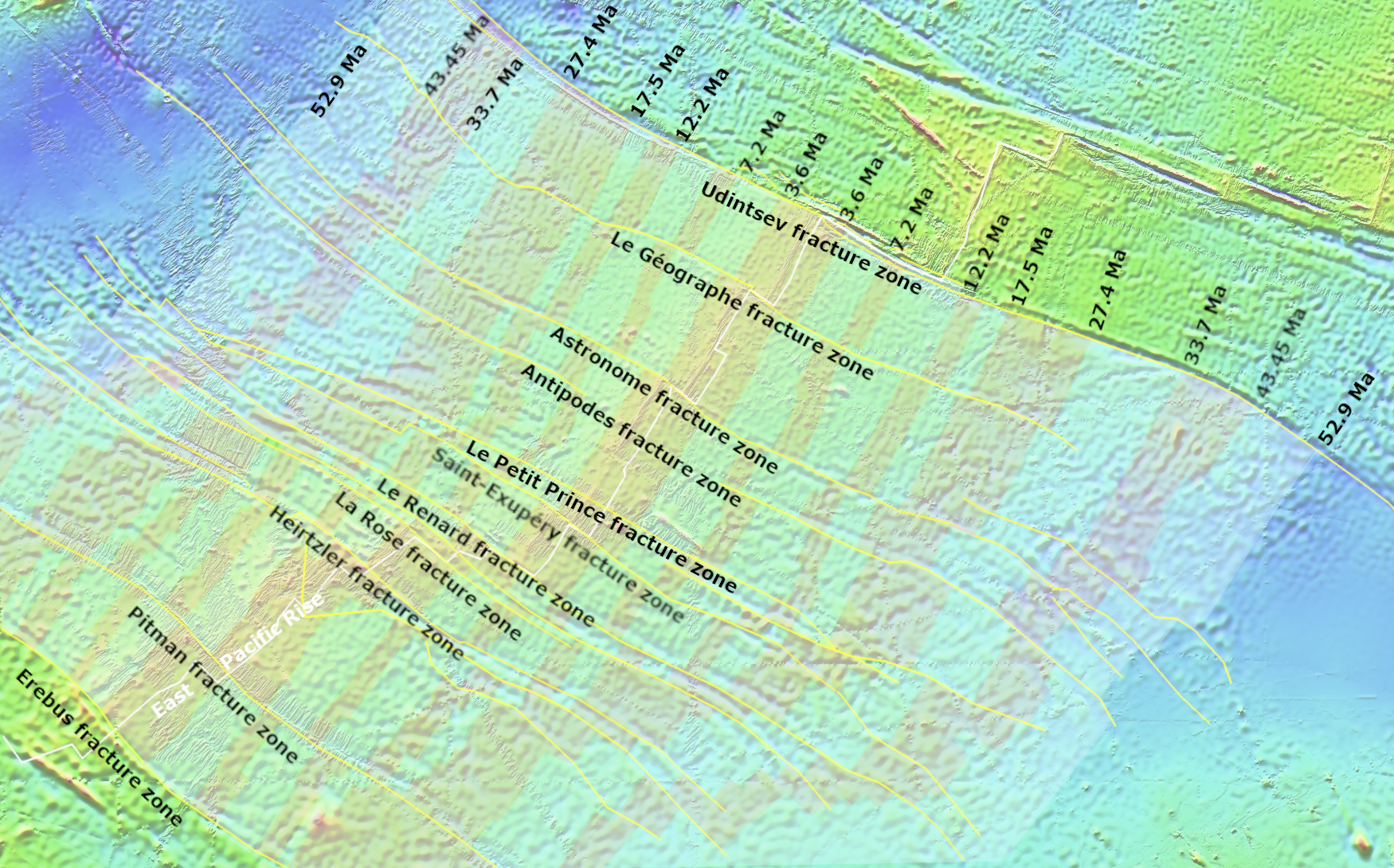
Magnetostratigraphy of the East Pacific Rise near the Heirtzler fracture zone showing ages of sea floor spreading in millions of years (Ma)

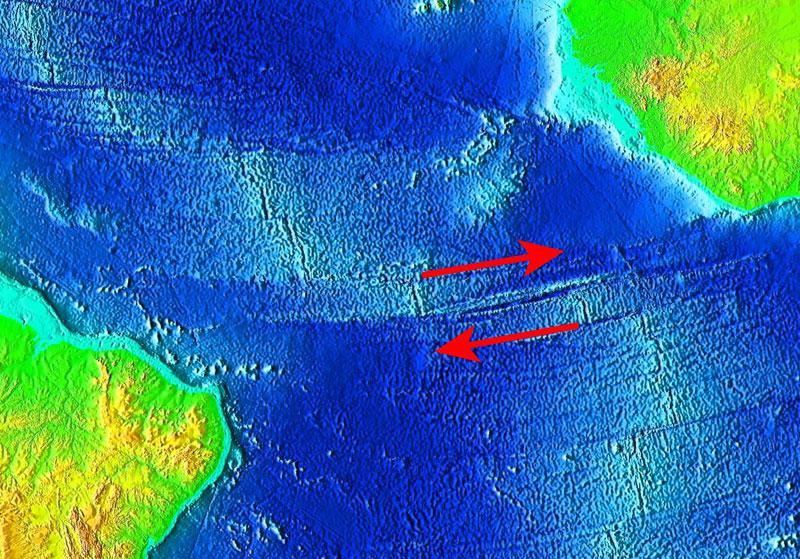
The Romanche fracture zone with red arrows indicating directions of movements of tectonic plates

As many areas of the ocean floor, particularly the Atlantic Ocean, are currently inactive, it can be difficult to find past plate motion. However, by observing the fracture zones, one can determine both the direction and rate of past plate motion. This is found by observing the patterns of magnetic striping on the ocean floor (a result of the reversals of Earth's magnetic field over time). By measuring the offset in the magnetic striping, one can then determine the rate of past plate motions. In a similar method, one can use the relative ages of the seafloor on either side of a fracture zone to determine the rate of past plate motions. By comparing how offset similarly aged seafloor is, one can determine how quickly the plate has moved.

== Examples ==
=== Blanco fracture zone ===
The Blanco fracture zone is a fracture zone running between the Juan de Fuca Ridge and the Gorda Ridge. The dominating feature of the fracture zone is the 150 km (93 mi) long Blanco Ridge, which is a high-angle, right-lateral strike slip fault with some component of dip-slip faulting.

=== Charlie-Gibbs fracture zone ===
The Charlie-Gibbs fracture zone consists of two fracture zones in the North Atlantic that extend for over 2,000 km (1,200 mi). These fracture zones displace the Mid-Atlantic Ridge a total of 350 km (220 mi) to the west. The section of the Mid-Atlantic Ridge between the two fracture zones is seismically active. The flow of major North Atlantic currents is associated with this fracture zone which hosts a diverse deep water ecosystem.

=== Heirtzler fracture zone ===
The Heirtzler fracture zone was named after James Ransom Heirtzler, who first demonstrated through magnetostratigraphy that the Mid-Atlantic Ridge was spreading south of Iceland, providing the first clear evidence for plate tectonics. This name was approved by the Advisory Committee on Undersea Features in 1993. The area around the Heirtzler fracture zone and the Pacific–Antarctic Ridge which is a southwestern portion of the East Pacific Rise has been mapped in detail by amongst other techniques magnetostratigraphy (see picture on this page).

=== Mendocino fracture zone ===
The Mendocino fracture zone extends for over 4,000 km (2,500 mi) off the coast of California and separates the Pacific plate and Gorda plate. The bathymetric depths on the north side of the fracture zone are 800 to 1,200 m (2,600 to 3,900 ft) shallower than to the south, suggesting the seafloor north of the ridge to be younger. Geologic evidence backs this up, as rocks were found to be 23 to 27 million years younger north of the ridge than to the south.

=== Romanche fracture zone ===
Also known as the Romanche Trench, this fracture zone separates the North Atlantic and South Atlantic oceans. The trench reaches 7,758 m (25,453 ft) deep, is 300 km (190 mi) long, and has a width of 19 km (12 mi). The fracture zone offsets the Mid-Atlantic Ridge by more than 640 km (400 mi).

=== Sovanco fracture zone ===
The Sovanco fracture zone is a dextral-slip transform fault running between the Juan de Fuca and Explorer Ridge in the North Pacific Ocean. The fracture zone is 125 km (78 mi) long and 15 km (9.3 mi) wide.

== See also ==
- Plate reconstruction
