= List of books about Go =

List of books about the board game Go

This list of books about Go is for books about the board game Go.

== Books in English ==
=== 0 ===
- Davies, James; Iwamoto, Kaoru (1999) [1st pub. 1972]. The 1971 Honinbo Tournament (3rd ed.). Kiseido. ISBN 978-4-906574-07-0.

=== A ===
- Redmond, Michael (2002). The ABC's of Attack and Defense. Slate and Shell. ISBN 978-1932001006.
- De Havilland, Walter (1910). The ABC of Go: The National War-Game of Japan. Kelly & Walsh. ASIN B000870XGQ.
- Zeijst, Rob van; Bozulich, Richard (2007). All About Ko. Kiseido. ISBN 978-4-906574-76-6.

Kido Classics, Amazing Happenings in the Game of Go, Vols. 1-3

- Chikun, Cho; Fujisawa, Shuko; Sakata, Eio; Takemiya, Masaki (Dec 1, 2010) [1st Pub. 1960-1999]. Terry, Robert J. (ed.). The History and Culture of Go in Japan. Kido Classics, Amazing Happenings in the Game of Go. Vol. 1. Translated by Terry, Robert J. ISBN 978-0-9831139-1-1.
- Kaiho, Rin; Kudo, Norio; Chikun, Cho; Abe, Yoshiteru; Fujisawa, Shuko; Sakata, Eio; Ishida, Yoshio (Dec 1, 2010) [1st Pub. 1960-1999]. Terry, Robert J. (ed.). The History and Culture of Go in Japan. Kido Classics, Amazing Happenings in the Game of Go. Vol. 2. Translated by Terry, Robert J. ISBN 978-0-9831139-2-8.
- Sakata, Eio; Ishida, Yoshio (2012) [1st Pub. 1977-1997]. Terry, Robert J.; Last, Mark E. (eds.). Joseki Basics and in Context. Kido Classics, Amazing Happenings in the Game of Go. Vol. 3. Translated by Terry, Robert J.

- Ohira, Shuzo (1977). Appreciating Famous Games. Ishi Press. ISBN 978-4-871870-25-2.

=== C ===
- Kato, Masao (1998) [1st Pub. 1989]. The Chinese Opening: The Sure-Win Strategy. Kiseido. ISBN 978-4-906574-33-9.
- Kaiho, Rin (2001). Come Up to Shodan. Translated by Langdon, Joe. Slate & Shell. ISBN 978-0-970619-37-2.

=== D ===
Dictionary of Basic Fuseki, Vols. 1-3

- Kaiho, Rin (2004). Dictionary of Basic Fuseki. Vol. 1. Yutopian Enterprises. ISBN 978-1-889554-87-7. [Ni-ren-sei (Two Star Points) and San-ren-sei (Three Star Points) Patterns]
- Kaiho, Rin (2005). Dictionary of Basic Fuseki. Vol. 2. Yutopian Enterprises. ISBN 978-1-889554-88-4. [Star Point and 3-4 Point Combinations]
- Kaiho, Rin (2008). Dictionary of Basic Fuseki. Vol. 3. Yutopian Enterprises. ISBN 978-1-889554-89-1. [5-4, 4-4 and 3-3 point josekis]
- Kaiho, Rin (2010). Dictionary of Basic Fuseki. Vol. 4. Yutopian Enterprises. [3-4 Point Openings]

Dictionary of Basic Tesuji, Vols. 1-4

- Fujisawa, Shuko (2004). Tesuji for Attacking. Dictionary of Basic Tesuji. Vol. 1. Richmond, VA: Slate and Shell. ISBN 978-1-932001-19-8.
- Fujisawa, Shuko (2005). Tesuji for Defending. Dictionary of Basic Tesuji. Vol. 2. Richmond, VA: Slate and Shell. ISBN 978-1-932001-23-5.
- Fujisawa, Shuko (2006). Tesuji for the Opening, for Capturing Races, and for Life and Death Problems, Part 1. Dictionary of Basic Tesuji. Vol. 3. Richmond, VA: Slate and Shell. ISBN 978-1-932001-25-9.
- Fujisawa, Shuko (2004). Tesuji for Life and Death Part 2, and for the Endgame. Dictionary of Basic Tesuji. Vol. 4. Richmond, VA: Slate and Shell. ISBN 978-1-932001-28-0.

- Abe, Yoshiteru (2004). Dramatic Moments On the Go Board. Yutopian Enterprises. ISBN 978-0-964184-79-4.

=== E ===
Elementary Go, Vols. 1-7

- Ikuro, Ishigure (2017) [1st pub. 1976]. In the Beginning. Elementary Go. Vol. 1 (revised ed.). Kiseido. ISBN 978-4-906574-10-0.
- Kosugi, Kiyoshi; Davies, James (2017) [1st pub. 1976]. 38 Basic Joseki. Elementary Go. Vol. 2 (6th ed.). Kiseido. ISBN 978-4-906574-11-7.
- Davies, James (2017) [1st pub. 1957]. Tesuji. Elementary Go. Vol. 3 (revised ed.). Ishi Press. ISBN 978-4-906574-12-4.
- Davies, James (2017) [1st pub. 1975]. Life and Death. Elementary Go. Vol. 4 (2nd ed.). Kiseido. ISBN 978-4-906574-13-1.
- Akira, Ishida; Davies, James (1997) [1st pub. 1980]. Attack and Defense. Elementary Go. Vol. 5 (revised ed.). Kiseido. ISBN 978-4-906574-14-8.
- Ogawa, Tomoko; Davies, James (2000) [1976]. The Endgame. Elementary Go. Vol. 6 (2nd ed.). Kiseido. ISBN 978-4-906574-15-5.
- Nagahara, Yoshiaki; Bozulich, Richard (1982). Handicap Go. Elementary Go. Vol. 7. Ishi Press. ISBN 978-4-871870-16-0.

- Takemiya, Masaki (1983). Enclosure Joseki:Attacking and Defending the Corner. Translated by Power, John. Ishi Press. ISBN 978-4-871870-24-5.

=== F ===
- Yang, Yilun (2004). Arnold, Keith; Huget, Kirby; Sanet, Joel (eds.). Fundamental Principles of Go. Translated by Lin, Chen-dao. Slate & Shell. ISBN 978-1-976297-24-3.

=== G ===
Get Strong at Go, Vols. 1-10

- Bozulich, Richard (August 1, 1996). Get Strong at the Opening. Get Strong at Go. Vol. 1. Kiseido. ISBN 4-906574-51-3.
- Bozulich, Richard (1995). Get Strong at Joseki 1. Get Strong at Go. Vol. 2. Kiseido. ISBN 4-906574-52-1.
- Bozulich, Richard; Kazunari, Furuyama (1996). Get Strong at Joseki 2. Get Strong at Go. Vol. 3. Kiseido. ISBN 4-906574-53-X.
- Bozulich, Richard; Kazunari, Furuyama (1996). Get Strong at Joseki 3. Get Strong at Go. Vol. 4. Kiseido. ISBN 4-906574-54-8.
- Bozulich, Richard (May 1, 1995). Get Strong at Invading. Get Strong at Go. Vol. 5. Kiseido. ISBN 4-906574-55-6.
- Bozulich, Richard (2002) [1st pub. 1998]. Get Strong at Tesuji. Get Strong at Go. Vol. 6. Kiseido. ISBN 978-4-906574-56-8.
- Bozulich, Richard (1997). Get Strong at Endgame. Get Strong at Go. Vol. 7. Kiseido. ISBN 4-906574-57-2.
- Bozulich, Richard (1997). Get Strong at Life and Death. Get Strong at Go. Vol. 8. Kiseido. ISBN 4-906574-58-0.
- Nagahara, Yoshiaki; Bozulich, Richard (August 1, 1998). Get Strong at Handicap Go. Get Strong at Go. Vol. 9. Kiseido. ISBN 4-906574-59-9.
- Bozulich, Richard (2002). Get Strong at Attacking. Get Strong at Go. Vol. 10. Kiseido. ISBN 4-906574-60-2.

- Iwamoto, Kaoru (1977). Go for Beginners. Pantheon Books. ISBN 978-0-394733-31-9.
- Fairbairn, John; Hall, T. Mark (2009), The Go Companion: Go in History and Culture, Slate & Shell, ISBN 978-1-932001-43-3
- Lasker, Edward (1960) [1st pub. 1934]. Go and Go-Moku:The Oriental Board Games (2nd ed.). Dover. ISBN 978-0-486206-13-4.
- Bozulich, Richard (July 1, 1992). The Go Player's Almanac. Ishi Press. ISBN 978-4-871870-40-5.
- Segoe, Kensaku (1960). Go Proverbs Illustrated. Translated by Bauer, John. Japanese Go Association. ASIN B000SAEIEG.

=== H ===
- Takagawa, Shukaku (1956). How to Play Go. Nihon Ki-in.

=== I ===
Improve Your Intuition, Vols. 1-3

- Takagawa, Kaku (2001). Fraser, Gordon; Cobb, William S. (eds.). Intuition in the Opening. Improve Your Intuition. Vol. 1. Slate & Shell. ISBN 978-0-970619-32-7.
- Takagawa, Kaku (2000). Fraser, Gordon; Cobb, William S. (eds.). Intuition in the middle Game Part 1: Attack & Defense. Improve Your Intuition. Vol. 2. Slate & Shell. ISBN 0-9706193-2-4.
- Takagawa, Kaku (2000). Fraser, Gordon; Cobb, William S. (eds.). Intuition in the middle Game: Part 2: How to Reduce a Moyo. Improve Your Intuition. Vol. 3. Slate & Shell. ISBN 0-9706193-2-4.

- Takemiya, Masaki (2004). Bianchi, Leslie; Crowl, Roland (eds.). Imagination of a Go Master: Logic Shattering Cosmic Go. Nemesis Enterprises, L.P. ISBN 978-0-971323-00-1.
- Davies, James; Bozulich, Richard (1984). An Introduction to Go. Ishi Press. ISBN 978-4-871870-30-6.

=== K ===
- Kageyama, Toshiro (1987). Kage's Secret Chronicles of Handicap Go. Translated by Davies, James. Ishi Press. ISBN 4-87187-017-0.
- Kato, Masao (2015) [1st Pub. 1978]. Kato's Attack and Kill. Translated by Fairbairn, John. Ishi press. ISBN 978-4-87187-027-6.
- Iwamoto, Kaoru (2002). Keshi and Uchikomi: Reduction and Invasion in Go. Slate & Shell. ISBN 978-0-970953-03-2.

=== L ===
Learn to Play Go, Vols. 1-5

- Kim, Janice; Jeong, Soo-Hyun (1997) [1994]. A Master's Guide to the Ultimate Game. Learn to Play Go. Vol. 1 (2 ed.). Good Moves Press. ISBN 978-0-964479-61-6.
- Kim, Janice; Jeong, Soo-Hyun (1995). The Way of the Moving Horse. Learn to Play Go. Vol. 2. Good Moves Press. ISBN 978-0-964479-62-3.
- Kim, Janice; Jeong, Soo-Hyun (1998) [1996]. The Dragon Style. Learn to Play Go. Vol. 3 (2 ed.). Good Moves Press. ISBN 978-0-964479-63-0.
- Kim, Janice; Jeong, Soo-Hyun (1997). Battle Strategies. Learn to Play Go. Vol. 4. Brian D'Amato. Good Moves Press. ISBN 978-0-964479-64-7.
- Kim, Janice; Jeong, Soo-Hyun (2011). The Palace of Memory. Learn to Play Go. Vol. 5. Good Moves Press. ISBN 978-0-964479-65-4.

- Kageyama, Toshiro (1996) [1st pub. 1978]. Lessons in the Fundamentals of Go. Translated by Davies, James. Kiseido. ISBN 4-906574-28-9.

=== M ===
- Cho, Chikun; Bozulich, Richard (1988). Magic of Go: A Complete Introduction to the Game of Go. Ishi Press. ISBN 978-4-871870-41-2.
- Labatut, Benjamín (2023). The MANIAC. Penguin Press. ISBN 978-0-593654-47-7.

Mastering the Basics, Vols. 1-5

- Zeijst, Rob van; Bozulich, Richard (2002). Five Hundred and One Opening Problems. Mastering the Basics. Vol. 1. Kiseido. ISBN 978-4-906574-71-1.
- Bozulich, Richard (February 2002). One Thousand and One Life-and-Death Problems. Mastering the Basics. Vol. 2. Kiseido. ISBN 978-4-906574-72-8.
- Bozulich, Richard (December 2002). Making Good Shape. Mastering the Basics. Vol. 3. Kiseido. ISBN 978-4-906574-73-5.
- Zeijst, Rob van; Bozulich, Richard (October 27, 2016). Five Hundred and One Tesuji Problems. Mastering the Basics. Vol. 4. Kiseido. ISBN 978-4-906574-74-2.
- Bozulich, Richard (2007). The Basics of Go Strategy. Mastering the Basics. Vol. 5. Kiseido. ISBN 978-4-906574-75-9.

- Berlekamp, Elwyn; Wolfe, David (2012). Mathematical Go Endgames: Nightmares for Professional Go Players. Ishi Press. ISBN 978-0-923891-36-7.
- Sakata, Eio (2007) [1st Pub. 1971]. The Middle Game of Go. Translated by Bozulich, Richard (4th ed.). Ishi Press. ISBN 978-0-923891-77-0.

Modern Joseki and Fuseki, Vols. 1-2

- Sakata, Eio (2006) [1st Pub. 1968]. Bozulich, Richard (ed.). Parallel Fuseki. Modern Joseki and Fuseki. Vol. 1. Translated by Bozulich, Richard (3rd ed.). Ishi Press International. ISBN 978-0-923891-75-6.
- Sakata, Eio (2006) [1st Pub. 1971]. Bozulich, Richard (ed.). The Opening Theory of Go. Modern Joseki and Fuseki. Vol. 2. Translated by Bozulich, Richard (3rd ed.). Ishi Press International. ISBN 978-0-923891-76-3.

=== N ===
- Nie, Weiping (1995). Nie Weiping on Go: The Art of Positional Judgment. Yutopian Enterprises. ISBN 978-0-964184-72-5.

=== P ===
- Redmond, Michael (2011). Patterns of the Sanrensei. Slate and Shell. ISBN 978-1-932001-63-1.
- Takagawa, Shukaku (1988). The Power of the Star Point:The Sanren-sei Opening. Ishi Press. ISBN 4871870324.
- Jiang, Mingjiu; Miller, Adam (2004). Punishing and Correcting Joseki Mistakes. Slate & Shell. ISBN 978-1-932001-14-3.

=== S ===
- Bozulich, Richard (2018) [1987]. The Second Book of Go (2 ed.). Kiseido. ISBN 978-4-906574-31-5.
- Surma, Mateusz (2018). Shapes of mind. Go Course for Beginners. polgote.com. ISBN 979-8427417471.
- Abe, Yoshiteru (2004). Step Up to a Higher Level. Yutopian Enterprises. ISBN 978-1-889554-94-5.

=== T ===
- Yang, Yilun (2001). Tricks in Joseki. Yutopian Enterprises. ISBN 978-1-889554-36-5.

=== V ===
- Takagawa, Kaku (1958). Vital Points of Go. Nihon Ki-in.

=== W ===
Whole Board Thinking in Joseki, Vols. 1-2

- Yang, Yilun; Straus, Phil (1995). 3-4 point, low kakari. Whole Board Thinking in Joseki. Vol. 1. Fourth Line Press. ISBN 978-0-965354-60-8.
- Yang, Yilun; Straus, Phil (1997). 3-4 point, high kakari & far kakari. Whole Board Thinking in Joseki. Vol. 2. Fourth Line Press. ISBN 978-0-965354-61-5.

=== Y ===
Yilun Yang's Go Puzzles, Vols. 1-2

- Yang, Yilun (2001). Cobb, William (ed.). Life and death by the Numbers. Yilun Yang's Go Puzzles. Vol. 1. Slate & Shell. ISBN 978-0-970619-35-8.
- Yang, Yilun (2002). Life and Death in Chinese Characters. Yilun Yang's Go Puzzles. Vol. 2. Slate & Shell. ISBN 978-1-932001-02-0.

Yilun Yang's Ingenous Life and Death Puzzles, Vols. 1-2

- Yang, Yilun; Dee, James (1997). Yang Yilun's Ingenious Life and Death Puzzles. Vol. 1. Yutopian Enterprises. ISBN 978-1-889554-06-8.
- Yang, Yilun; Dee, James (1997). Yang Yilun's Ingenious Life and Death Puzzles. Vol. 2. Yutopian Enterprises. ISBN 978-1-889554-07-5.

You won’t get dumber while thinking, Vols. 1-8

- Surma, Mateusz (2018). You won’t get dumber while thinking. Life & death problems with answers for 18-20 kyu. polgote.com. ISBN 979-8433160774.
- Surma, Mateusz (2018). You won’t get dumber while thinking. Life & death problems with answers for 15-17 kyu. polgote.com. ISBN 979-8433755727.
- Surma, Mateusz (2018). You won’t get dumber while thinking. Life & death problems with answers for 12-14 kyu. polgote.com. ISBN 979-8433773127.
- Surma, Mateusz (2018). You won’t get dumber while thinking. Life & death problems with answers for 10-11 kyu. polgote.com. ISBN 979-8433788374.
- Surma, Mateusz (2018). You won’t get dumber while thinking. Life & death problems with answers for 8-9 kyu. polgote.com. ISBN 979-8433796744.
- Surma, Mateusz (2018). You won’t get dumber while thinking. Life & death problems with answers for 6-7 kyu. polgote.com. ISBN 979-8433802902.
- Surma, Mateusz (2018). You won’t get dumber while thinking. Life & death problems with answers for 4-5 kyu. polgote.com. ISBN 979-8433812833.
- Surma, Mateusz (2018). You won’t get dumber while thinking. Life & death problems with answers for 3 kyu. polgote.com. ISBN 979-8433874367.

== Books in Chinese ==
Memoirs of a Floating Life, Vols. 1-3

- 《浮生後記》 [Memoirs of a Floating Life] (in Chinese), vol. 1, Bookzone, March 2004, ISBN 986-417-152-6
- 《浮生再記》 [Memoirs of a Floating Life] (in Chinese), vol. 2, Bookzone, September 2005, ISBN 957-444-257-8
- 《浮生三記》 [Memoirs of a Floating Life] (in Chinese), vol. 3, Bookzone, September 2005, ISBN 957-444-255-1

《沈君山說棋王故事》 (Shen Chun-shan Tells the Stories of Kings of Go), Vols. 1-5

- 《吳清源》 [Go Seigen] (in Chinese), vol. 1, Boss, June 2006, ISBN 957-588-493-0
- 《木谷實》 [Kitani Minoru] (in Chinese), vol. 2, Boss, June 2006, ISBN 957-588-497-3
- 《林海峰》 [Rin Kaiho] (in Chinese), vol. 3, Boss, June 2006, ISBN 957-588-494-9
- 《曹薰鉉》 [Cho Hunhyun] (in Chinese), vol. 4, Boss, June 2006, ISBN 957-588-495-7
- 《聶衛平》 [Nie Weiping] (in Chinese), vol. 5, Boss, June 2006, ISBN 957-588-496-5

== Books in Japanese ==
- アマ四強はこうして強くなった [Ama 4-kyowa koushite tsuyokunatta] (in Japanese). Seibundo Shinkosha. 1967-01-01.
- 菊池康郎打碁集 [Kikuchi Yasuro Uchigoshū] (in Japanese). Seibundo Shinkosha. 1979-03-01.
- 囲碁に強くなる本 上達への秘密作戦 [Igoni tsuyokunaru hon - jotasuheno himitu sakusen] (in Japanese). Kin'ensha. 1980.
- 囲碁の初歩の初歩 これで碁が打てる [Igono shohono shoho - korede goga uteru] (in Japanese). Kin'ensha. 1980.
- 緑星学園—囲碁を通じて人間育成 夢とおどろき [Ryokusei gakuen - igowo tsujite ningen ikusei - yumeto odoroki] (in Japanese). Floral Shuppan. 2002.
- Kikuchi, Yasuro (2006-02-20). "岡目八目" [Okame hachimoku] (in Japanese). Yomiuri Shimbun.
- Yuki, Satoshi (2004). 結城聡 戦いに強くなる方法―シチョウの達人を目指す (真・囲碁講座シリーズ) (in Japanese). 毎日コミュニケーションズ. ISBN 978-4839915094.
- Yuki, Satoshi (2005). 結城聡名局細解 (in Japanese). Seibundo Shinkosha. ISBN 978-4416705124.
- Yuki, Satoshi (2008). 結城聡 囲碁・世界の新手法ガイド (in Japanese). Seibundo Shinkosha. ISBN 9784416508121.
- Yuki, Satoshi (2009). 決定版 大斜・村正・大ナダレ (in Japanese). Seibundo Shinkosha. ISBN 978-4416509050.
- Yuki, Satoshi (2010). プロの選んだ30の定石 アマの好きな30の定石 (in Japanese). ISBN 978-4416510063.
- Yuki, Satoshi (2010-09-28). 世界一わかりやすい打碁シリーズ 結城聡の碁 (in Japanese). 毎日コミュニケーションズ. ISBN 978-4839936815.
- Yuki, Satoshi (2013-09-23). 星の小ゲイマジマリ 後の攻防: 強くなる 囲碁・必須読本 (in Japanese). Seibundo Shinkosha. ISBN 9784416313091.
- Yuki, Satoshi (2014). 実戦手筋のテクニック (日韓精鋭棋士囲碁双書) (in Japanese). Kientosho 棋苑図書. ISBN 9784873653174.
- Tanioka, Ichiro; Saito, Kenmei; Yuki, Satoshi; Shimamura, Masahiro (2015). Toshitaka Asae (ed.). "結城聡の「冒険また冒険". 囲碁梁山泊 2015 白秋号 (in Japanese) (1st ed.). 関西社会人囲碁連盟. ISBN 9784907488093.
- Rin Kono (2015-10-19). 名局細解 2012年5月号： 第67期本因坊リーグ 河野臨九段 VS 結城聡九段 [Meikyoku Saikai, May 2012 issue - 67th Honinbo league, Rin Kono 9-dan vs Satoshi Kono 9-dan] (kindle) (in Japanese). ASIN B016UBUZLG.

Tesuji Dictionary, Vols. 1-3

- Segoe, Kensaku; Seigen, Go (2003). 手筋事典 [Tesuji Dictionary] (in Japanese). Vol. 1. Seibundo Shinkosha (誠文堂新光社). ISBN 978-4-416703-00-7.
- Segoe, Kensaku; Seigen, Go (2003). 手筋事典 [Tesuji Dictionary] (in Japanese). Vol. 2. Seibundo Shinkosha (誠文堂新光社). ISBN 978-4-416703-01-4.
- Segoe, Kensaku; Seigen, Go (2003). 手筋事典 [Tesuji Dictionary] (in Japanese). Vol. 3. Seibundo Shinkosha (誠文堂新光社). ISBN 978-4-416703-02-1.

- Yasunaga, Hajime; Kitani, Minoru; Seigen, Go (1994) [1st Pub. 1934]. 新布石法 [Shin Fuseki Method]. Sanichi Shobo (三一書房). ISBN 978-4-380942-82-2.

== Other languages ==
- Lusson, Pierre; Roubaud, Jacques; Perec, Georges (1986) [1st Pub. 1969]. Petit traité invitant à la découverte de l'art subtil du go [Small treatise inviting to discover the subtle art of go] (in French). Paris: Christian Bourgois. ISBN 978-2-267004-42-7.

== Fiction ==
- Sa, Shan (2004) [Fr. Pub. 2001]. The Girl Who Played Go. Translated by Hunter, Adriana. Vintage.
- Yasunari, Kawabata (1996). The Master of Go. Translated by Seidensticker, Edward G. Vintage Books. ISBN 978-0-679761-06-8.
