= Masaaki =

- Gender: Male

Origin
- Origin: Japanese
- Meaning: Different meanings depending on the kanji used

Masaaki (written: 正明, 正昭, 正晃, 正亮, 正朗, 正章, 正秋, 正彰, 正亮, 政明, 政昭, 政章, 雅明, 雅昭, 雅章, 真明, 真秋, 昌明, 昌謙, 将明, 将晃, 方明, 良昭, 順昭, 成晃, 誠章 or 祇晶) is a masculine Japanese given name. Notable people with the name include:

- Masaaki Akaike (赤池 誠章; born 1961), Japanese politician
- Asukai Masaaki (17th-century poet) (飛鳥井 雅章; 1611–1679), Japanese poet
- Masaaki Daito (大塔 正明; born 1973), Japanese baseball player
- Masaaki Endoh (遠藤 正明; born 1967), Japanese singer-songwriter
- Masaaki Esaka (江坂 政明; born 1967), Japanese baseball player
- Masaaki Fujita (藤田 正明; 1922–1996), Japanese politician
- Masaaki Fukuoka (福岡 政章; born 1984), Japanese judoka
- Masaaki Furukawa (古川 昌明; born 1968), Japanese footballer
- Masaaki Goto (後藤 雅明; born 1994), Japanese footballer
- Masaaki Hatsumi (初見 良昭; born 1931), Japanese ninjutsu practitioner
- Masaaki Higashiguchi (東口 順昭; born 1986), Japanese footballer
- Masaaki Hirano (平野 雅章; 1931–2008), Japanese food historian
- Masaaki Hiyama (日山 正明; born 1959), Japanese drummer
- Masaaki Ideguchi (井手口 正昭; born 1988), Japanese footballer
- Masaaki Iinuma (飯沼 正明; 1912–1941), Japanese aviator
- Masaaki Ikenaga (池永 正明; born 1946), Japanese baseball player
- Masaaki Imai (今井 正明; born 1930), Japanese business theorist
- Inaba Masaaki (稲葉 正明; 1723–1793), Japanese daimyō
- Masaaki Itokawa (糸川 正晃; born 1974), Japanese politician
- Masaaki Kanagawa (金川 正明; born 1955), Japanese Go player
- Masaaki Kanda (神田 真秋; born 1951), Japanese politician
- Masaaki Kaneko (金子 正明; born 1940), Japanese sport wrestler
- Masaaki Kanno (菅野 将晃; born 1960), Japanese footballer and manager
- Masaaki Kato (加藤 正明; born 1958), Japanese footballer
- Masaaki Kimura (木村 政昭; born 1940), Japanese academic
- Masaaki Kishibe (岸部 真明; born 1964), Japanese guitarist
- Masaaki Kitaru (木樽 正明; born 1943), Japanese baseball player
- Masaaki Koido (小井土 正亮; born 1978), Japanese footballer
- Masaaki Koike (小池 正晃; born 1980), Japanese baseball player
- Masaaki Koyama (小山 正明; 1934–2025), Japanese baseball player
- Masaaki Kozu (神津 正昭; born 1974), Japanese cross-country skier
- Masaaki Kukino (久木野 雅昭), Japanese video game producer
- Masaaki Mochizuki (望月 成晃; born 1970), Japanese professional wrestler
- Masaaki Mori (森 正明; born 1961), Japanese footballer
- Masaaki Mori (baseball) (森 祇晶; born 1937), Japanese baseball player and manager
- Masaaki Murakami (村上 昌謙; born 1992), Japanese footballer
- Masaaki Nakagawa (中川 政昭; 1943–2005), Japanese photographer
- Masaaki Nishimori (西森 正明; born 1985), Japanese footballer
- Masaaki Niwa, Japanese engineer
- Masaaki Noiri (野杁 正明; born 1993), Japanese kickboxer
- Oginohana Masaaki (小城ノ花 正昭; 1935–2006), Japanese sumo wrestler
- Masaaki Osaka (大坂 正明; born c. 1950), Japanese communist and murderer
- Masaaki Ōsawa (大沢 正明; born 1946), Japanese politician
- Masaaki Ōsumi (大隅 正秋; born 1934), Japanese anime director
- Masaaki Oyagi (大八木 政明; born 1948), Japanese luger
- Masaaki Sakai (堺 正章; born 1946), Japanese actor and singer
- Masaaki Sakata (坂田 正彰; born 1972), Japanese rugby union player
- Masaaki Satake (佐竹 雅昭; born 1965), Japanese karateka, kickboxer and mixed martial artist
- Masaaki Sawanobori (澤登 正朗; born 1970), Japanese footballer
- Masaaki Shimakawa (島川 正明; 1912–1997), Japanese World War II flying ace
- Masaaki Shirakawa (白川 方明; born 1949), Japanese economist and banker
- Masaaki Suzuki (鈴木 雅明; born 1954), Japanese musician and conductor
- Masaaki Tachihara (立原 正秋; 1926–1980), Japanese writer
- Masaaki Taira ((平 将明; born 1967), Japanese politician
- Masaaki Takada (高田 昌明; born 1973), Japanese footballer
- Masaaki Tanaka (田中 正明; 1911–2006), Japanese writer
- Masaaki Taniai (谷合 正明; born 1973), Japanese politician
- Masaaki Toma (當麻 政明; born 1973), Japanese football referee
- Masaaki Tsukada (塚田 正昭; born 1938), Japanese voice actor
- Masaaki Tsuya (津谷 正明), Japanese businessman
- Masaaki Ueki (植木 政明; orn 1939), Japanese karateka
- Masaaki Yaguchi (柳下 正明; born 1979), Japanese guitarist and DJ
- Masaaki Yamada (山田 雅章; born 1942), Japanese physicist
- Masaaki Yamazaki (山崎 正昭; born 1942), Japanese politician
- Masaaki Yanagishita (柳下 正明; born 1960), Japanese footballer and manager
- Masaaki Yuasa (湯浅 政明; born 1965), Japanese anime director, animator and screenwriter

== See also ==
- Masaki (disambiguation)
