= Masaki (given name) =

- Gender: Male

Origin
- Origin: Japanese
- Meaning: Different meanings depending on the kanji used

Masaki is a Japanese given name. Notable people with the name include:

- Masaki Aiba (相葉 雅紀; born 1982), Japanese singer, actor, television personality, radio host and dancer
- Masaki Batoh (馬頭 將噐; born 1966), Japanese member of the band Ghost (Japanese band)
- Masaki Chugo (中後 雅喜; born 1982), Japanese professional football manager and former player
- Masaki Doi (土井 真樹; born 1960), Japanese politician
- Masaki Ejima (江島 雅紀; born 1999), Japanese pole vaulter
- Masaki Eto (江藤 正基; born 1954), Japanese sport wrestler
- Masaki Fujihata (藤幡 正樹; born 1956), Japanese sound, installation, and interactive artist
- Masaki Fujita (藤田 征樹; born 1985), Japanese para-cyclist
- Masaki Fukai (深井 正樹; born 1980), Japanese former footballer
- Masaki Haruna (春名 真樹; born 1970), known as Klaha, Japanese former singer-songwriter
- Masaki Hayamizu (早水 将希; born 1984), Japanese assistant coach
- Masaki Hemmi (辺見 昌樹; born 1986), Japanese former footballer
- Masaki Honda (本多 政材; 1889–1964), Japanese lieutenant general
- Masaki Hoshino (星野 正樹; 1967–2019), Japanese professional Go player
- Masaki Iida (飯田 真輝; born 1985), Japanese football player
- Masaki Iinuma (born 1992), Japanese former footballer
- Masaki Ikeda (池田 昌生; born 1999), Japanese football player
- Masaki Inayoshi (稲吉 正樹; born 1969), Japanese owner and founder of G.Communication
- Masaki Inoue (井上 昌己; born 1979), Japanese Olympic cyclist
- Masaki Ito (伊藤 正樹; born 1988), Japanese trampolinist
- Masaki Iwai (岩井 真幸; born 1985), Japanese curler
- Masaki Izumi (泉 正樹; born 1961), Japanese shogi player
- Masaki Jyonai (城内 政樹; born 1962), Japanese racing driver and businessman
- Masaki Kaito (海藤 正樹; born 1963), Japanese former volleyball player
- Masaki Kaji (加治 将樹; born 1988), Japanese actor and singer
- Masaki Kajishima (梶島 正樹; born 1962), Japanese animator and storyboard artist
- Masaki Kanda (神田 正輝; born 1950), Japanese actor
- Masaki Kaneko (金子 雅紀; born 1992), Japanese Olympic swimmer
- Masaki Kano (加納 政樹; born 1976), Japanese auto racing driver
- Masaki Kashiwara (柏原 正樹; born 1947), Japanese mathematician and professor
- Masaki Kito (紀藤 正樹; born 1960), Japanese attorney
- Masaki Kobayashi (小林 正樹; 1916–1996), Japanese filmmaker
- Masaki Kyomoto (京本 政樹; born 1959), Japanese actor, singer-song writer, and guitarist
- Masaki Liu, American music producer
- Masaki Maki (真木 将樹; born 1976), Japanese former professional baseball pitcher
- Masaki Matsudaira (松平 正樹; born 1943), Japanese equestrian
- Masaki Mimori (三森 大貴; born 1999), Japanese professional baseball Infielder
- Masaki Minami (南 昌輝; born 1989), Japanese former professional baseball pitcher and current coach
- Masaki Miyasaka (宮阪 政樹; born 1989), Japanese football player
- Masaki Morinaga (森長 正樹; born 1972), Japanese retired long jumper
- Masaki Murata (村田 聖樹; born 1999), Japanese professional footballer
- Masaki Nagase (長瀬 真幸; 1765–1835), Japanese literature, kokugakusha, and samurai retainer
- Masaki Nakao (中尾 暢樹; born 1996), Japanese actor and entertainer
- Masaki Nashimoto (梨本 真輝; born 1993), Japanese sprinter
- Masaki Niiyama (村田 聖樹; born 1993), Japanese swimmer
- Masaki Nishina (仁科 克基; born 1982), Japanese actor and tarento
- Masaki Nishizawa (西沢 正樹; born 1972), Japanese mixed martial artist
- Masaki Ogata (小県 真樹; born 1964), Japanese Go player
- Masaki Ogawa (小川 雅己; born 1975), Japanese footballer and manager
- Masaki Ogushi (大串 正樹; born 1966), Japanese politician
- Masaki Ohashi (大橋 雅貴; born 1993), Japanese field hockey player
- Masaki Oka (岡 正晶; born 1956), Japanese jurist
- Masaki Okada (岡田 将生; born 1989), Japanese actor
- Masaki Okimoto (沖本 摩幸; born 1982), Japanese professional wrestler
- Masaki Okino (沖野 将基; born 1996), Japanese footballer
- Masaki Orita (折田 正樹; born 1942), Japanese lawyer
- Masaki Oya (大家 正喜; born 1966), Japanese long-distance runner
- Masaki Oya (大宅 真樹; born 1995), Japanese volleyball player
- Masaki Oyokawa (及川 雅貴; born 2001), Japanese professional baseball pitcher
- Masaki Saito (斎藤 雅樹; born 1965), Japanese former Nippon Professional Baseball pitcher
- Masaki Saito (齋藤 将基; born 1980), Japanese football player
- Masaki Sakamoto (阪本 将基; born 1996), Japanese football player
- Masaki Sato (佐藤 優樹; born 1999), Japanese pop singer
- Masaki Shiba (斯波 正樹; born 1986), Japanese snowboarder
- Masaki Shibata (柴田 正章; born 1953), Japanese Olympic handball player
- Masaki Shimazaki (島崎 正樹; 1834–1886), Japanese gōnō, honjin master, student of kokugaku, and Shinto priest
- Masaki Shirai (白井 眞輝; born 1982), Japanese musician
- Masaki Suda (菅田 将暉; born 1993), Japanese actor and singer
- Masaki Sumitani (住谷 正樹; born 1975), Japanese comedian, television personality, and retired professional wrestler
- Masaki Suzuki (鈴木 正樹; born 1945), Japanese speed skater
- Masaki Takahashi (高橋 正紀; born 1968), Japanese CG director and visual effects artist
- Masaki Takemiya (武宮 正樹; born 1951), Japanese Go player
- Masaki Takeuchi (竹内 将生; born 1995), Japanese Muay Thai fighter and kickboxer
- Masaki Tamura (田村 正毅; 1939–2018), Japanese cinematographer
- Masaki Terasoma (寺杣 昌紀; born 1962), Japanese actor and voice actor
- Masaki Tokudome (徳留 真紀; born 1971), Japanese former motorcycle racer
- Masaki Toshiro (戸城 正貴; born 1980), Japanese Olympic luger
- Masaki Toyoda (豊田 将樹; born 1998), Japanese athlete
- Masaki Tsuchihashi (土橋 正樹; born 1972), Japanese footballer
- Masaki Tsuji (辻 真先; born 1932), Japanese scenario writer
- Masaki Tsukano (塚野 真樹; born 1970), Japanese footballer
- Masaki Ueda (上田 正樹; born 1949), Japanese R&B and soul singer and composer
- Masaki Ukyo (右京 雅生), Japanese video game designer and programmer and a former game designer
- Masaki Watai (渡井 理己; born 1999), Japanese footballer
- Masaki Watanabe (渡辺 正毅; 1911–1995), Japanese orthopedic surgeon
- Masaki Watanabe (渡邉 将基; born 1986), Japanese footballer
- Masaki Yamada (山田 雅樹; born 1964), Japanese singer, guitarist and bassist
- Masaki Yamada (山田 正紀; born 1950), Japanese crime and science fiction author
- Masaki Yamamoto (山本 真希; born 1987), Japanese footballer
- Masaki Yamamoto (山本 大喜; born 1996), Japanese cyclist
- Masaki Yanagawa (柳川 雅樹; born 1987), Japanese footballer
- Masaki Yokotani (横谷 政樹; born 1952), Japanese footballer
- Masaki Yoshida (吉田 正樹; born 1984), Japanese footballer
- Yoshinohana Masaki (義ノ花 成典; born 1943), Japanese sumo wrestler
- Masaki Yumiba (弓場 将輝; born 2002), Japanese footballer

== Fictional characters ==
- Masaki Ichijo, a character in the web novel series The Irregular at Magic High School
- Masaki Michishita, a character in the manga Kuso Miso Technique
- Sasami Masaki Jurai, a character in the anime and manga series Tenchi Muyo!
- Masaki Takigawa (日本語：滝川雅貴), a character in the light novel series and anime Tsurune

== See also ==
- Masaki (disambiguation)
- Masaki (surname)
- Masaaki
