= Kageyama =

Kageyama (written: 影山, 蔭山 or 景山) is a Japanese surname. Notable people with the surname include:

- Akari Kageyama (影山 灯; born 1993), Japanese voice actress
- Hiromichi Kageyama (蔭山 弘道; born 1967), Japanese volleyball player
- Hironobu Kageyama (影山 ヒロノブ; born 1961), Japanese musician and singer
- Isaku Kageyama (born 1982), American musician
- Jinsuke Kageyama (影山 任佐; born 1948), Japanese psychiatrist
- Kazuo Kageyama (蔭山 和夫; 1927–1965), Japanese baseball player and manager
- Kenji Kageyama (景山 健司; born 1980), Japanese footballer
- Megumi Kageyama (景山 恵; born 1992), Japanese field hockey player
- Masahiko Kageyama (影山 正彦; born 1963), Japanese racing driver
- Masami Kageyama (影山 正美; born 1967), Japanese racing driver
- Masanaga Kageyama (影山 雅永; born 1967), Japanese footballer
- Rodney Kageyama (1941–2018), American actor
- Shigenori Kageyama (影山 楙倫), Japanese animation director
- Takashi Kageyama (影山 貴志; born 1977), Japanese footballer
- Tamio Kageyama (景山 民夫; 1947–1998), Japanese writer
- Toshiro Kageyama (影山 利郎; 1926–1990), Japanese Go player
- Yoshitaka Kageyama (影山 由高; born 1978), Japanese footballer
- Yūka Kageyama (影山 優佳; born 2001), Japanese actress

== Fictional characters ==
- Ranmaru Kageyama (影山 蘭丸), a character from the adventure game Kimi ga Shine -Tasūketsu Death Game-
- Ritsu Kageyama (影山 律), a character in the manga series Mob Psycho 100
- Shigeo Kageyama (影山 茂夫), protagonist of the manga series Mob Psycho 100
- Shun Kageyama (影山 瞬), a character from the tokusatsu Kamen Rider Kabuto
- Tobio Kageyama (影山 飛雄), a character in the manga series Haikyu!!
