= Baltic Sea anomaly =

Indistinct sonar image of Baltic Sea floor

The Baltic Sea anomaly sonar image by OceanX

The Baltic Sea anomaly is a feature visible on an indistinct sonar image taken by Peter Lindberg, Dennis Åsberg and their Swedish OceanX diving team while treasure hunting on the floor of the northern Baltic Sea at the center of the Gulf of Bothnia in June 2011. The team suggested their sonar image showed an object with unusual features of seemingly non-natural origin, prompting speculation published in tabloid newspapers that the object was a sunken UFO.

A consensus of experts and scientists say that the image most likely shows a natural geological formation.

== History ==
The Swedish-based OceanX describe themselves as treasure hunters and salvage operators. According to the team, they returned from an expedition in the Baltic Sea between Sweden and Finland with a "blurry but interesting" sonar image while searching for an old shipwreck in the summer of 2011. They have claimed their image shows a 60-metre (200 ft) diameter circular object with features that appeared possibly man-made. The group revisited the site the following year to get more detailed sonar scans. Following a story published by the UK tabloid newspaper the Daily Mail in June 2012, a number of wildly speculative theories became popular.

Samples of stone recovered at the site by OceanX were given to Volker Brüchert, an associate professor of geology at Stockholm University. Brüchert's analysis of the samples indicated that most are granites, gneisses and sandstones. Among the samples was a loose piece of basaltic (volcanic) rock typical of many on the site, which is out of place on the seafloor, but not unusual. "Because the whole northern Baltic region is so heavily influenced by glacial thawing processes, both the feature and the rock samples are likely to have formed in connection with glacial and postglacial processes. [...] Possibly these rocks were transported there by glaciers," explained Brüchert. Swedish geologists Fredrik Klingberg and Martin Jakobsson say that the chemical composition of the samples provided resembles that of nodules that are not uncommon in sea beds, and that the materials found, including limonite and goethite, can indeed be formed by nature itself. The geologists did not have actual samples from the object but only from the seafloor and surrounding material.

== Response ==
The single sonar image provided by OceanX has drawn criticism from a number of sources. Hanumant Singh of the Woods Hole Oceanographic Institution has said that it cannot be trusted because several distortions render it "virtually useless for identifying an undersea formation". According to Singh, the distortions are due to a cheap inaccurate sonar instrument that was improperly wired and calibrated. An MSNBC report speculated that interpretations of the image as a flying saucer are likely the result of graphic outlines intended to suggest the fictional spaceship Millennium Falcon drawn onto the sonar image by tabloid newspapers.

Scientist Charles Paull of the Monterey Bay Aquarium Research Institute told Popular Mechanics that the indistinct sonar image was more likely of a rock outcrop, sediment dropped from a fishing trawler, or even a school of fish. Paull characterized the story as “curious and fun, but much ado about nothing."

Reacting to a photo published by Swedish newspaper Expressen purportedly taken by OceanX during a dive to collect rock samples, Göran Ekberg, a marine archaeologist at Maritime Museum in Stockholm, said: "A natural, geological formation can't be ruled out. I agree the finding looks weird since it's completely circular. But nature has produced stranger things than that."

Martin Jakobsson, professor of marine geology and geophysics at Stockholm University, also examined the image: "I'm guessing it's some sort of sandstone. But to make things clear, I've only seen the media images, and I need more material before making an official statement." Other experts say the image quite possibly shows a grouping of rocks deposited by ice age glaciers, or maybe pillow basalt or a moraine.

According to Finnish planetary geomorphologist Jarmo Korteniemi, volcanic-based explanations such as a hydrothermal vent are not plausible on the Fennoscandian shield as it is a thick craton with no active volcanism after the Proterozoic, and regional bathymetry explains the "runway" formation under the anomaly as part of a larger group of similar NNW-SSE oriented mounds which occur located on the bottom of the Bothnian Sea. Korteniemi said the "runway" is most likely a natural rock formation, a drumlin formed by glacial action.

Jonathan Hill of the Mars Space Flight Facility questioned the motives involved in OceanX announcements, which included plans to take wealthy tourists in a submarine to visit the site. He was quoted in 2012: "Whenever people make extraordinary claims, it's always a good idea to consider for a moment whether they are personally benefiting from the claim or if it's a truly objective observation." He also suggested that it would have been simple to break off a piece and have it geologically tested, and said that test results showing it was simply rock would not have benefited Peter Lindberg.

Lindberg suggested in a 2019 interview that there may be a possibility for a new expedition via a television production in which they are involved.

== See also ==
- Bimini Road
- Eltanin Antenna
- Giant's Causeway
- Pantelleria Vecchia Bank Megalith
- Unidentified submerged object
- Yonaguni Monument
