= Masaki =

Masaki may refer to:

== Name ==
- Masaki (given name), a unisex Japanese given name
- Masaki (surname), a Japanese surname

== Places ==
- Masaki, Ehime, a town located in Iyo District, Japan
- Masaki Art Museum, a museum in Tadaoka, Osaka Prefecture, Japan that opened in 1968
- Masaki Station (disambiguation)
- Masaki, a suburb in Dar es Salaam, Tanzania
