= Yonaguni Monument =

Submerged rock formation off the coast of Japan

Yonaguni Monument: Yonaguni (Island) Submarine Ruins; Yonaguni Submarine Topography
- Rock formation
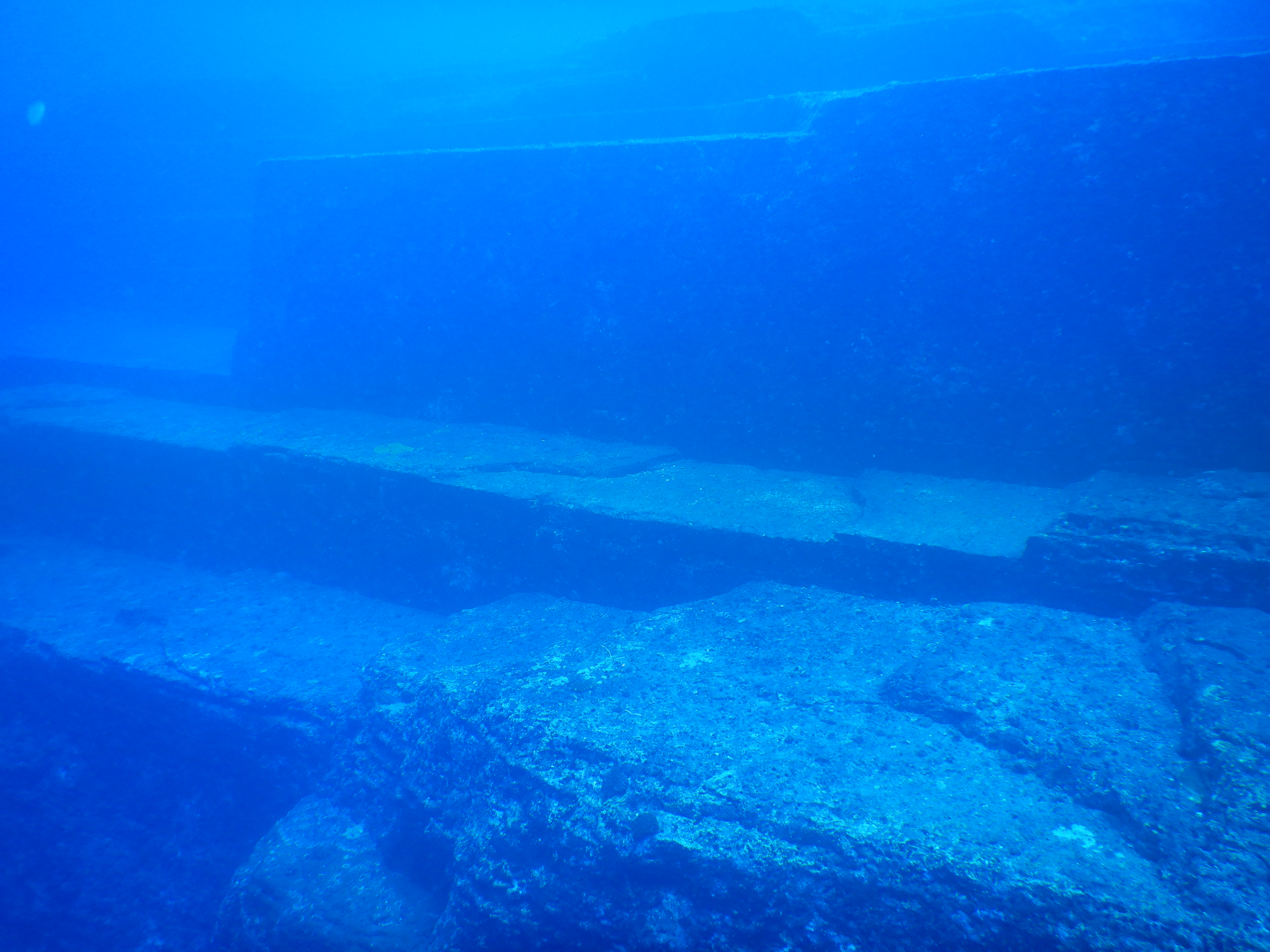
- Yonaguni Monument, as seen from the south of the formation.

- Location within Japan
- Coordinates: 24°26′09″N 123°00′41″E
- Location: Japan
- Water bodies: Philippine Sea

Dimensions
  - Depth: 26 m (85 ft)

The Yonaguni Monument (Japanese: 与那国島海底地形, Hepburn: Yonaguni-jima Kaitei Chikei; lit. 'Yonaguni Island Seafloor Topography'), also known as the Yonaguni (Island) Submarine Ruins (与那国（島）海底遺跡, Yonaguni(-jima) Kaitei Iseki), is a submerged rock formation off the coast of Yonaguni, the southernmost of the Ryukyu Islands, in Japan. It lies approximately 100 kilometres (54 nmi; 62 mi) east of Taiwan.

Marine geologist Masaaki Kimura claims that the formations are man-made stepped monoliths. These claims have been described as pseudoarchaeological. Neither the Japanese Agency for Cultural Affairs nor the government of Okinawa Prefecture recognise the features as important cultural artifacts and neither government agency has carried out research or preservation work on the site.

== Discovery ==
The sea off Yonaguni is a popular diving location during the winter months because of its large population of hammerhead sharks. In 1986, while seeking to observe the sharks, Kihachiro Aratake, a director of the Yonaguni-Cho Tourism Association, noticed some seabed formations resembling architectural structures. Shortly thereafter, a group of scientists directed by Masaaki Kimura of the University of the Ryukyus visited the formations.

== Location and geology ==
The formations are located below Arakawabana (新川鼻; Yonaguni: Araga-bana) cliff, which is the southern tip of Yonaguni island, with its main face oriented south-southeast.

It is composed of medium to very fine sandstones and mudstones of the Early Miocene Yaeyama Group, believed to have been deposited about 20 million years ago. Most of the rocks in the formations are connected to the underlying rock mass (as opposed to being assembled out of freestanding rocks).

== Natural formation ==
Geologist Robert M. Schoch believes that it is most likely natural. Schoch observed the sandstones that make up the Yonaguni formation to "contain numerous well-defined, parallel bedding planes along which the layers easily separate. The rocks of this group are also criss-crossed by numerous sets of parallel, vertically oriented joints in the rock. These joints are natural, parallel fractures by which the rectangular formations seen in the area likely formed. Yonaguni lies in an earthquake-prone region; such earthquakes tend to fracture the rocks in a regular manner." He also observes that there are similar formations on the northeast coast of Yonaguni. John Anthony West visited the formation with Schoch and agreed that it was a natural formation and that Kimura "had not looked carefully enough at the natural processes at work." Schoch also believes that the "drawings" identified by Kimura are natural scratches on the rocks, and suggests that the "walls" are simply natural horizontal platforms which fell into a vertical position when rock below them eroded, and the alleged roads are simply channels in the rock.

German geologist Wolf Wichmann, who studied the formations in 1999 during an expedition organized by Spiegel TV, and in 2001 by invitation of Graham Hancock, concluded that they could have been formed by natural processes.

At Sanninudai, there are onshore step-like sandstone formations similar to those of the Yonaguni. Robert Schoch, as well as Patrick D. Nunn, Professor of Oceanic Geoscience at the University of the South Pacific, note that the formations are purely natural.

In 2019, Takayuki Ogata and other researchers conducted a topographical analysis of Yonaguni Island using a digital elevation model and geological field investigations of the strata, rocks, and microtopography of outcrops at three locations, known as "geosites", Tindabana, Kube Ryofurishi, and Sanninudai. As a result of their research, they noted that although Yonaguni Monument may look like an artificial construction, it is a natural feature formed by the weathering and erosional processes acting on bedding and linear joints in sandstone. They noted that similar features can be found at Sanninudai geosite and commonly observed on the south coast of Yonaguni Island.

=== Pseudoarchaeological claims of artificial structures ===
Kimura first estimated that the formation must be at least 10,000 years old, dating it to a period when it would have been above water, and therefore surmised that the site may be a remnant of the mythical lost continent of Mu. In a report given to the 21st Pacific Science Congress in 2007, he revised this estimate and dated it to 2,000 to 3,000 years ago because the sea level then was close to current levels. He suggested that after construction, tectonic activity caused it to be submerged below sea level. Archaeologist Richard J. Pearson believes this to be unlikely. Kimura believes he can identify a pyramid, castles, roads, monuments and a stadium. He further stated that he believes the structures to be remnants of Yamatai culture.

Supporters of artificial origin, such as Graham Hancock, also argue that while many of the features seen at Yonaguni are also seen in natural sandstone formations throughout the world, the concentration of so many peculiar formations in such a small area is highly unlikely. They also point to the relative absence of loose blocks on the flat areas of the formation, which would be expected if they were formed solely by natural erosion and fracturing. Robert Schoch, who believes the formation was formed geologically, has noted that the rocks are swept by strong currents.

== Visitors ==
The formation has become a relatively popular attraction for divers despite strong ocean currents. A notable visitor was freediver Jacques Mayol, who wrote a book on his dives at Yonaguni.

== See also ==
- Bimini Road
- Geofact
- Giant's Causeway
- Marine archaeology in the Gulf of Khambhat
- Pantelleria Vecchia Bank Megalith
- Tor (rock formation)
- Unidentified submerged object
