= Bimini Road =

Underwater rock formation near North Bimini island in the Bahamas

Coordinates: 25.766967°N 79.278826°W

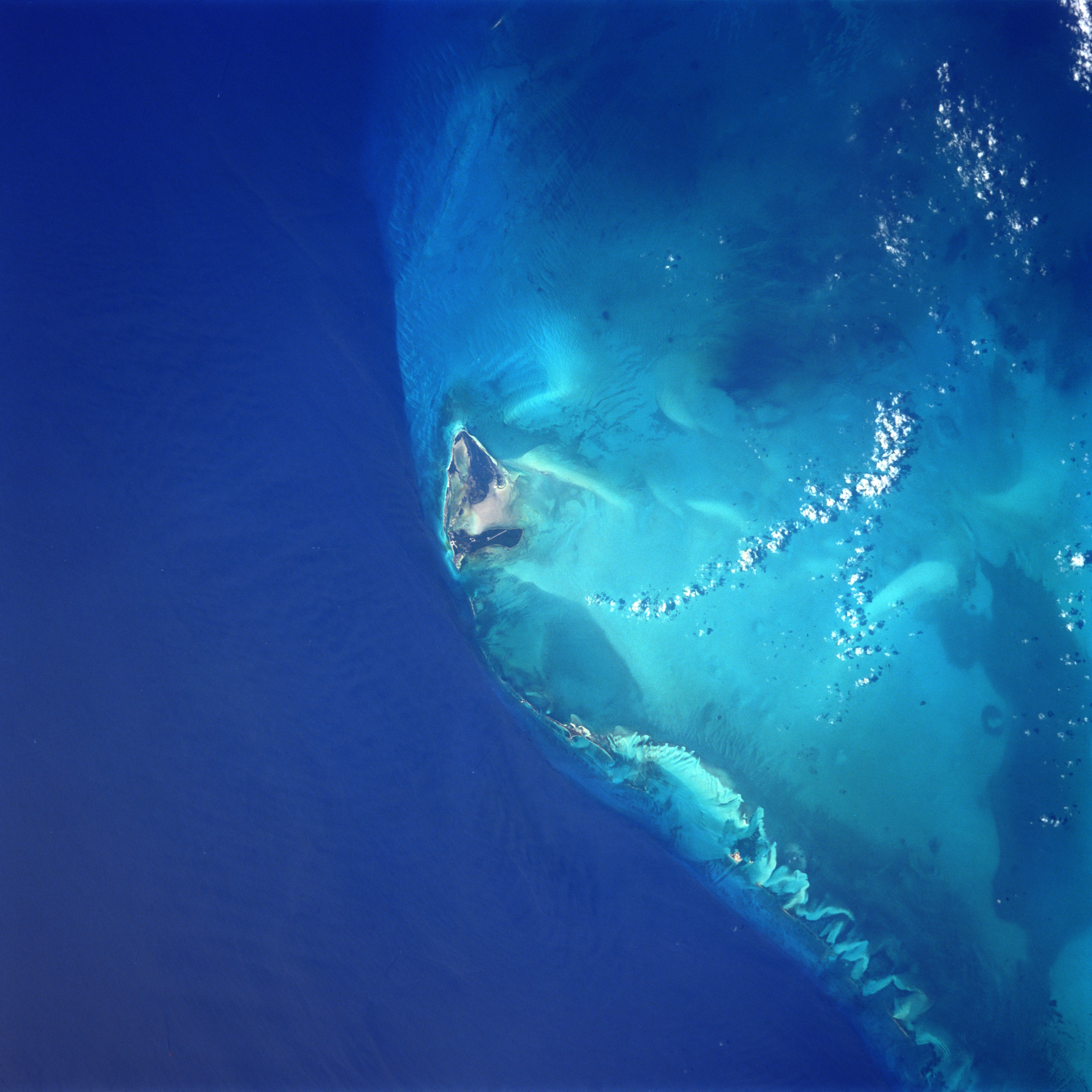
Bimini Islands

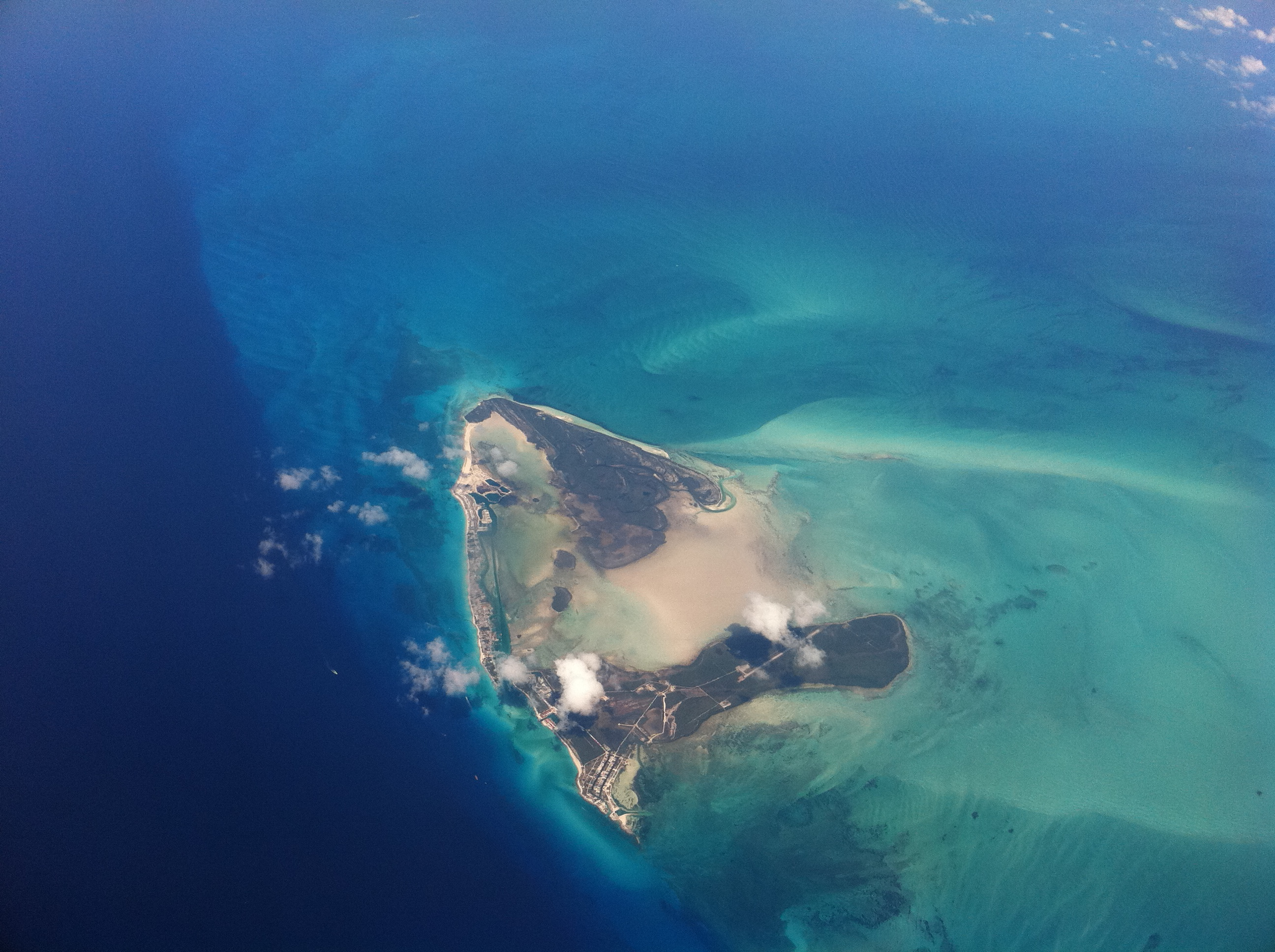
North and South Bimini islands

The Bimini Road, sometimes called the Bimini Wall, is an underwater rock formation near the island of North Bimini in the Bimini chain of islands. The Road consists of a 0.8 km (0.50 mi)-long northeast-southwest linear feature composed of roughly rectangular limestone blocks. Various claims have been made for this feature being either a wall, road, pier, breakwater, or other man-made structure. However, credible evidence or arguments are lacking for such an origin.

== Physical characteristics ==
On September 2, 1968, while diving in 5.5 meters (18 feet) of water off the northwest coast of North Bimini, Joseph Manson Valentine, Jacques Mayol and Robert Angove encountered what they called a "pavement" of what later was found to be noticeably rounded stones of varying size and thickness. These stones form a northeast-southwest linear feature, which is now commonly known as either the "Bimini Road" or "Bimini Wall". Two similar linear features lie parallel to and shoreward of the Bimini Wall.

The Bimini Wall and two linear features lying shoreward of it are composed of flat-lying, tabular, and roughly rectangular, polygonal, and irregular blocks. Descriptions of the Bimini Road found in various books and articles greatly exaggerate the regularity and rectangularity of the blocks composing these features. The Bimini Road, the largest of three linear features, is 0.8 km (0.50 mi) long, a northeast/southwest-trending feature with a pronounced hook at its southwest end. It consists of stone blocks measuring as much as 3–4 metres (10–13 ft) in horizontal dimensions, with the average size being 2–3 metres (7–10 ft). The larger blocks show complementary edges, which are lacking in the smaller blocks. The two narrower and shorter, approximately 50 and 60 m (160 and 200 ft)-long linear features lying shoreward of the Bimini Road consist of smaller tabular stone blocks that are only 1–2 m (3–7 ft) in maximum horizontal breadth. Having rounded corners, the blocks composing these pavements resemble giant loaves of bread. The blocks consist of limestone composed of carbonate-cemented shell hash that is called "beachrock". Beachrock is native to the Bahamas. The highly rounded nature of the blocks forming the Bimini Road indicates that a significant thickness of their original surface has been removed by biological, physical, and chemical processes. Given the degree to which these blocks have been eroded, it is highly implausible that any original surface features, including any tool marks and inscriptions, would have survived this degree of erosion.

After a very detailed examination of the Bimini Road and the other linear features, Gifford and Ball made the following observations:

1. The three features are unconnected at the southwest end; scattered blocks are present there but do not form a well-defined linear feature connecting the seaward, middle, and shoreward features.
2. No evidence exists anywhere over the three features of two courses of blocks, or even a single block set squarely atop another.
3. Not enough blocks lie in the vicinity of the three features to have formed a now-destroyed second course of rocks.
4. Bedrock closely underlies the entire area of the three features (fig. 5), eliminating the possibility of excavations or channels between them.
5. Indications are that the blocks of the inner and middle features have always rested on a layer of loose sand. No evidence was found of the blocks' being cut into or founded on the underlying bedrock surface.
6. In areas of the seaward feature where blocks rest directly on the bedrock surface, no evidence was found of regular or symmetrical supports beneath any of the blocks.
7. We saw no evidence on any of the blocks of regular or repeated patterns of grooves or depressions that might be interpreted as tool marks.
8. The inner and middle features are continuous over a distance of only about 50 metres (160 feet). Though the seaward feature extends several hundred metres farther to the northeast, it too is not well founded or continuous enough to have served as some kind of thoroughfare.

— J.A. Gifford and M.M. Ball, 1980

As noted below, these observations are disputed by other investigators. For example, some investigators claim that where sand had washed away between the seams, another course of blocks can be seen along with small blocks underlying these blocks. However, detailed evidence that clearly documents the alleged presence of a continuous second layer (course) of stones beneath the stones forming the currently exposed "pavement" has not been published in a reputable, scientific venue with the detail that is needed for critical evaluation. Pictures posted on various Web pages of stones alleged to be artificial "wedge stones" and "prop stones" fail as convincing evidence for a second course of stones because they are typically smaller in size, do not form a continuous course, and too infrequently lie directly beneath the blocks that form the surface of the Bimini Road. This is not what would be expected of an actual underlying course of man-made masonry.

David Zink states:

Most of the blocks were now clearly resting on either the underlying bedrock or on smaller stones on the sea floor.

— David Zink

This led him to conclude:

...this fact had an important archaeological consequence: it meant that the idea (held by some Atlantologists) that the blocks now visible were only the top of a more complex structure was likely incorrect.

In addition, early studies of the Bimini Road, i.e. Gifford and Ball and David Zink, report taking numerous samples and cores for examination. It is also safe to presume that a certain number of the innumerable visitors to the Bimini Road have chipped off pieces of it. Scientific sampling and souvenir hunting would have left behind modern "tool marks" on the various blocks composing the Bimini Road for later investigators to find.

== Age ==
Attempts have been made to determine the age of this feature using different techniques. These include direct radiocarbon dating of the stones composing the Bimini Road and uranium-thorium dating of the marine limestone on which the Bimini Road lies.

In 1978, the radiocarbon laboratory operated by the Department of Geology at the University of Miami dated samples from a core collected by E. A. Shinn in 1977 from the Bimini Road. In 1979, Calvert and others reported dates of 2780±70 ^{14}C yr BP (UM-1359), 3500±80 ^{14}C yr BP (UM-1360), and 3350±90 ^{14}C yr BP (UM-1361) from whole-rock samples; a date of 3510±70 ^{14}C yr BP (UM-1362), from shells extracted from the beachrock core; and dates of 2770±80 ^{14}C yr BP (UM-1364) and 2840±70 ^{14}C yr BP (UM-1365) from carbonate cementing the beachrock core. These dates are temporally consistent in that the shells composing the beachrock core from the Bimini Road dated older than the cement holding them together as beachrock. These dates can be interpreted as indicating that the shells composing the Bimini Road are, uncorrected for temporal and environmental variations in radiocarbon, about 3,500 years old. Because of time-averaging and other taphonomic factors, a random collection of shells likely would yield a radiocarbon date that is a few hundred years earlier than when the final accumulation of shells, which were cemented to form beachrock, actually occurred. The radiocarbon dates from the cement demonstrate that the beachrock composing the Bimini Road formed about 2,800 radiocarbon years ago by the cementation of pre-existing sediments that accumulated about 1,300 years earlier. Compared to the dates from the shells and the cement, it appears that the whole-rock dates reflect samples containing varying proportions of shell and cement without any significant contamination by younger radiocarbon. Both these dates and interpretation are consistent with the detailed research by Davaud and Strasser that concluded that the layer of beachrock composing the Bimini Road formed beneath the surface of the island and was exposed by coastal erosion only about 1,900 to 2,000 years ago.

Proponents of the Bimini Road being a manmade feature argue that these radiocarbon dates are invalid because they were obtained entirely from whole-rock samples and subject to contamination from younger carbon. The background data reported by Calvert and others concerning the radiocarbon dates from the Bimini Road demonstrate that not all of these dates come entirely from whole-rock samples. That the dates from the shells and the clearly younger cement holding them together as beachrock are temporally consistent argues against any significant alteration of their radiocarbon content. In addition, other studies using radiocarbon dating to study sea level and the age of sediment and beachrock within the Bahamas have not reported any significant problems with contamination by younger radiocarbon. In their detailed research, Davaud and Strasser accepted the radiocarbon dates obtained from the beachrock composing the Bimini Road from the radiocarbon laboratory at the University of Miami as valid indicators of its age.

Gifford and Ball attempted to establish a minimum age using uranium-thorium dating for the Bimini Road by dating a whole-rock sample of the marine limestone (biopelsparite) that underlies the beachrock that composes the Bimini Road. They described this sample as being "Whole rock marine limestone under beachrock off Paradise Point, North Bimini; some recrystallisation." This sample yielded a uranium-thorium date of 14,992±258 BP (7132-19/2). Supporters of the idea that the Bimini Road is a man-made structure frequently cite this date in support of its being artificial.

The uranium-thorium date published by Gifford and Ball is regarded as an invalid and meaningless date for two reasons. First, the sample being partially recrystallised means that this limestone was not a closed system as required for a meaningful uranium-thorium date. As a result, this specific date is only an apparent date that completely lacks any scientific value for interpreting the age of marine limestone underlying the Bimini Road. Currently, specific species of corals and mollusks that can be demonstrated to lack any recrystallisation using petrographic and X-ray diffraction techniques are the preferred samples for dating. Any limestone sample that shows the least amount of recrystallisation is now regarded as incapable of yielding a scientifically valid date and not even worth an attempt at dating. Finally, it is well documented that about 15,000 calendar years ago, sea level in this region was between 95 and 100 metres (312 and 328 feet) below present sea level. As a result, the location from where Gifford and Ball collected the sample of limestone was between 90 and 95 metres (295 and 312 feet) above sea level at the time indicated by the uranium-thorium date of 14,992±258 BP (7132-19/2). Therefore, it is physically impossible for the marine limestone underlying the Bimini Road to have accumulated around 15,000 BP. Thus, this uranium-thorium date is a meaningless, invalid date lacking any scientific significance. Because this date lacks any scientific meaning, geologists and archaeologists rarely mention it in their discussions of the Bimini Road. The marine limestone underlying the Bimini Road dates to the Sangamonian Stage, the last interglacial, when sea level was last high enough for the marine sediments, now lithified into limestone, to have accumulated.

== Geological formation ==
The consensus among geologists and archaeologists is that the Bimini Road is a natural feature composed of beachrock that orthogonal and other joints have broken up into roughly rectangular, polygonal, and irregular blocks. The geologists and anthropologists who have personally studied the Bimini Road include Eugene Shinn of the U.S. Geological Survey; Marshall McKusick, an Associate Professor of Anthropology at University of Iowa; W. Harrison of Environmental Research Associates, Virginia Beach, Virginia; Mahlon M. Ball and J. A. Gifford of the Rosenstiel School of Marine, Atmospheric, and Earth Science at the University of Miami; and Eric Davaud and A. Strasser of the Department of Geology and Paleontology, University of Geneva, Geneva, Switzerland. After either inspecting or studying the Bimini Road, they all concluded that it consists of naturally jointed beachrock. John A. Gifford, a professional geologist, spent time studying the area for his University of Miami Master's thesis about the geology of the Bimini Islands. Calvert and others identified the samples that they dated from the Bimini Wall as being natural beachrock.

Detailed studies by E. Davaud and A. Strasser of Holocene limestones currently exposed on North Bimini and Joulter Cays (Bahamas) reveal the sequence of events likely responsible for creating beachrock pavements like the Bimini Road. First, a complete beach sequence of shallow subtidal, intertidal, and supratidal carbonate sediments accumulated as the shoreline of North Bimini built seaward during part of the Holocene. Once the deposition of these sediments built the North Bimini's shoreline seaward, freshwater cementation of the carbonate occurred at some depth, possibly even a metre or so below sea level, beneath the island's surface. This cementation created a band consisting of a thick primary layer of semilithified sediments and thinner discontinuous lenses and layers of similar semilithified sediments beneath it. Later, when erosion of the island's shoreline occurred, the band of semilithifed sediment was exposed within the intertidal zone and the semilithified sediments were cemented into beachrock. As the sediments underlying the eroding shoreline were eroded down to Pleistocene limestone, the beachrock broke into flat-lying, tabular, and roughly rectangular, polygonal, and irregular blocks as observed for modern beaches within the Bahamas by E. Davaud and A. Strasser. Thinner layers of beachrock underlying the primary bed of beachrock were also broken up as the loose sediments enclosing them and the thicker primary bed were eroded. As the loose sediment was scoured out from under the blocks and other pieces of beachrock by so-called "scour and settling processes", they dropped downward for several metres until they rested directly on the erosion-resistant Pleistocene limestone as an erosional lag. Eugene Shinn discusses a similar, but not identical, process by which the Bimini Road could have been created.

The downward movement of large, solid objects by scour and settling processes has been documented by Jesse E. McNinch, John T. Wells, and other researchers. They concluded that large, heavy objects could sink into the sea bottom by several metres without significant lateral movement as the result of scour and settling processes if an erosion-resistant layer of sediment were not encountered. In case of the beachrock blocks composing the Bimini Road and other pieces underlying it, the erosion-resistant layer that limited how far they were dropped downward by scour and settling processes is the Pleistocene limestone on which they now rest.

Finally, pieces of thinner layers or lenses of beachrock underlying the primary bed that was broken up and dropped downward to create the Bimini Road would be trapped beneath the blocks as they also were broken up and dropped by erosion. The trapping of these fragments of beachrock beneath the blocks composing the Bimini Road, as erosion removed loose sediments and dropped them onto the surface of the Pleistocene limestone, would have created the so-called "prop" and "wedge" rocks and blocks alleged to be a "second course" of "masonry". Presuming that the blocks of beachrock forming the Bimini Road originally formed at some unknown depth below sea level and have been dropped by erosion by several metres, dating the age of the Bimini Road by its relation to past sea level would be a useless technique that would produce misleading results.

Natural pavements composed of stone blocks, which often are far more rectangular and consistent in size than the blocks composing the Bimini Road, created by orthogonal and other jointing within sedimentary rocks, including beachrock, are quite common and found throughout the world. They include a popular tourist attraction, the Tessellated pavement of Eaglehawk Neck, Tasmania; jointed bedrock that has been completely misidentified as a man-made "Phoenician Fortress and Furnace" in Oklahoma; a "tiled pavement" reported from Battlement Mesa in western Colorado; the tessellated pavement of the Bouddi Peninsula near Sydney, Australia; and Arches National Park in Utah. Natural beachrock pavements that are identical to the Bimini Road have been found eroding out of the east shore of Loggerhead Key of Dry Tortugas and submerged beneath 90 metres (300 feet) of water at Pulley Ridge off the southwest coast of Florida.

== Claims of a human origin ==
Although it is generally considered to be a naturally occurring geological feature, the unusual arrangement and shape of the stones have prompted some people to hypothesize that the formation is the remains of an ancient road, wall, or some other deliberately constructed feature. For example, articles published in Argosy (an American men's adventure magazine) and either authored or coauthored by Robert F. Marx, a professional diver and visitor to the Bimini Road, argued that the Bimini Road is an artificial structure. In a 1971 Argosy article, Marx reported that Carl H. Holm, who was President (not "head geologist" as reported by Marx) of Global Oceanic, once a manager for North American Rockwell, a ship designer; and retired naval officer, stated that there was "little doubt" that the massive stone blocks were cut by people. The same article noted that he was part of an expedition sponsored by North American Rockwell that included Edgar Mitchell, the astronaut, as leader; Dimitri Rebikoff; and "a number of psychics from the Edgar Cayce Foundation."

Others who consider the Bimini undersea formation to be man-made, as opposed to natural beachrock, are Joseph Manson Valentine, zoologist; Graham Hancock, pseudoscientific writer; Charles Berlitz, linguist; Greg Little, psychologist; R. Cedric Leonard, anthropologist; and Dimitri Rebikoff, French marine engineer. All claim to have investigated the formations in person, and claim to have observed more than one horizontal layer of blocks, at least in places. However, multiple layers of block can result naturally from systematic fracturing of sedimentary rock where multiple layers of sedimentary rock lie on top of each, as can be observed in the case of the tessellated pavement of Tasmania exposed at Eaglehawk Neck on the Tasman Peninsula.

In his debunked pseudohistorical book 1421: The Year China Discovered America, amateur historian Gavin Menzies falsely claimed that when Chinese admiral Zheng He's fleet was circumnavigating the globe from 1421 to 1423, it stopped at Bimini. According to Menzies, half of the fleet, under the command of admiral Zhou Wen, was caught in a hurricane near Bimini and built the Bimini Road from beach rock and the ships' ballast as a slipway to haul damaged junks ashore for refitting and repairs of damage caused by the hurricane. There is no evidence for these claims.

== See also ==
- Adam's Bridge – Chain of shoals between India and Sri Lanka
- Baltic Sea anomaly – Indistinct sonar image of Baltic Sea floor
- Bermuda Triangle – Urban legend based on region in North Atlantic
- Cuban underwater formation – Possible submerged granite
- Desert pavement – Type of desert earth surface
- Limestone pavement – Natural karst landform consisting of a flat, incised surface of exposed limestone
- Marine archaeology in the Gulf of Khambhat – Archaeological exploration along Western Indian coast
- Yonaguni Monument – Submerged rock formation off the coast of Japan
- Early Holocene sea level rise (Global sea level rise thousands of years ago)
