= Pantelleria Vecchia Bank Megalith =

Anomalous underwater artifact of uncertain origin

The Pantelleria Vecchia Bank Megalith is an anomalous artifact of uncertain origin, located on the Pantelleria Vecchia Bank in the Strait of Sicily between Sicily and Tunisia, at a depth of 40 meters underwater. Studies have suggested that the object appears to be man-made. The megalith is a large block of sedimentary calcirudite limestone measuring 12 meters long, and weighing 15 tons.

The stone may have been carved when the area last stood above sea level around 10,000 years ago during the early Mesolithic. The radiocarbon dating of shell fragments extracted from the stone indicate the stone itself to be 40,000 years old while the sea floor surrounding the megalith is 10 million years old. This suggests that the megalith may have been carved from imported stone.

The megalith contains three holes with similar diameters, which are partially filled with barnacles and other crustaceans. One of the holes, with a diameter of 60 centimeters, visibly extends all the way through the stone.

== History ==
The megalith was discovered by Emanuele Lodolo and Zvi Ben-Avraham in 2015 during a seafloor mapping survey in an area called the Pantelleria Vecchia Bank, located about 60 kilometers south of Sicily. After scans indicated a large roughly rectangular object, divers and cameras were deployed to capture photographic evidence. The divers described what appeared to be a large monolith, broken into two sections.

The entire Pantelleria Vecchia Bank is a shallow area which was once an island. Based on known sea level data, it is estimated that the island last stood above the sea level almost 10,000 years ago.

== See also ==
- Unidentified submerged object
- Underwater archaeology
- Yonaguni Monument
