= Yumiko Okada =

Japanese Go player

Personal information
- Native name: 岡田 結美子 (Japanese)
- Full name: Yumiko Okada
- Born: June 22, 1970 (age 56) Unknown, Japan

Sport
- Teacher: Yoshiteru Abe
- Rank: 6 dan
- Affiliation: Nihon Ki-in

Yumiko Okada (岡田 結美子, Okata Yumiko; born 22 June 1970) is a female professional 6 dan Go player.

== Biography ==
Born Yumiko Abe (安倍 結美子), Okada is the daughter of Yoshiteru Abe, who also acted as her tutor. She is married to Shinichiro Okada, a 7 dan professional. In 2004, Yumiko Okada obtained the rank of 6 dan.
