= Beachrock =

Sedimentary rock cemented with carbonates, formed along a shoreline

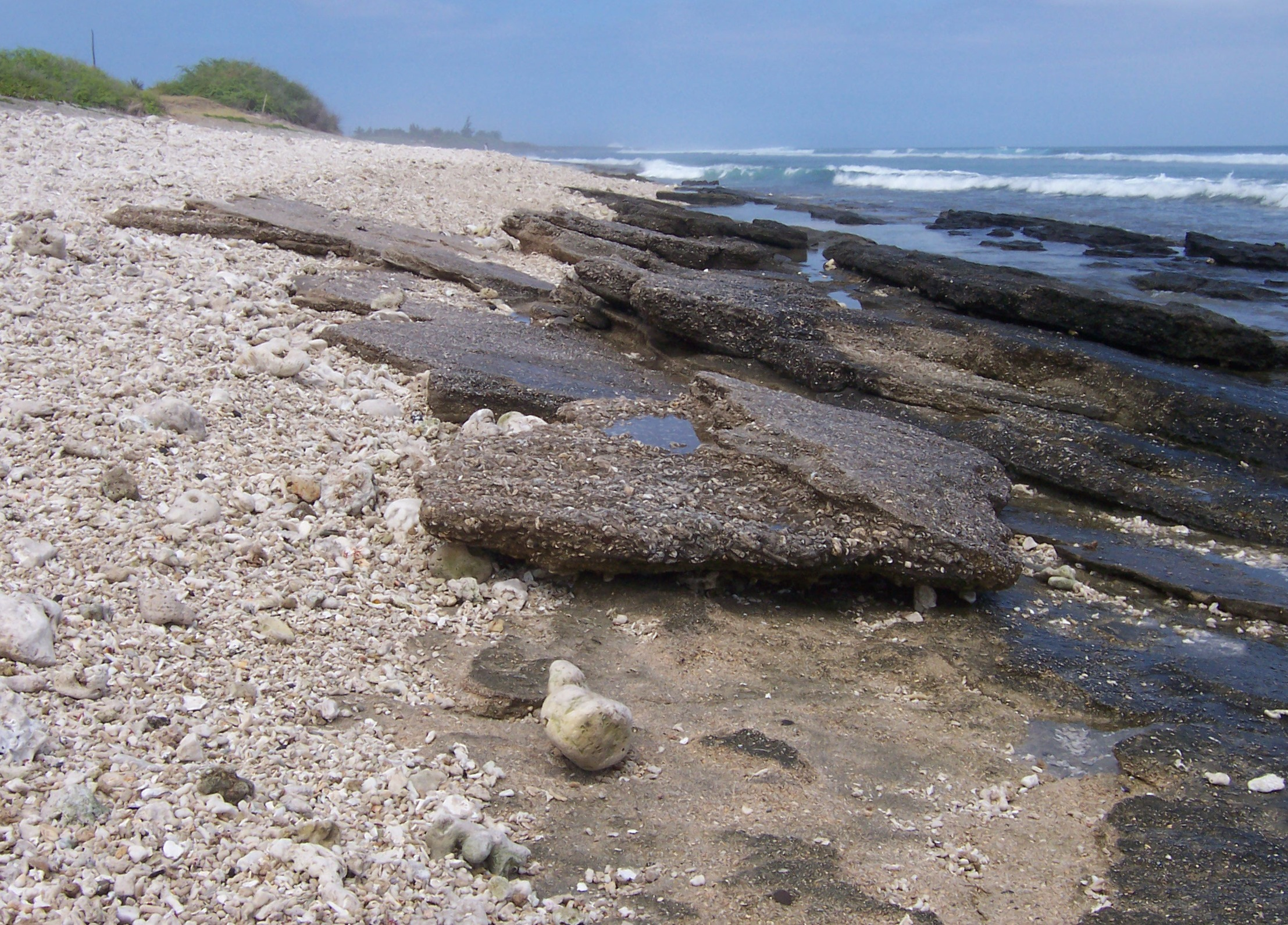
Beachrock along Réunion island seashore

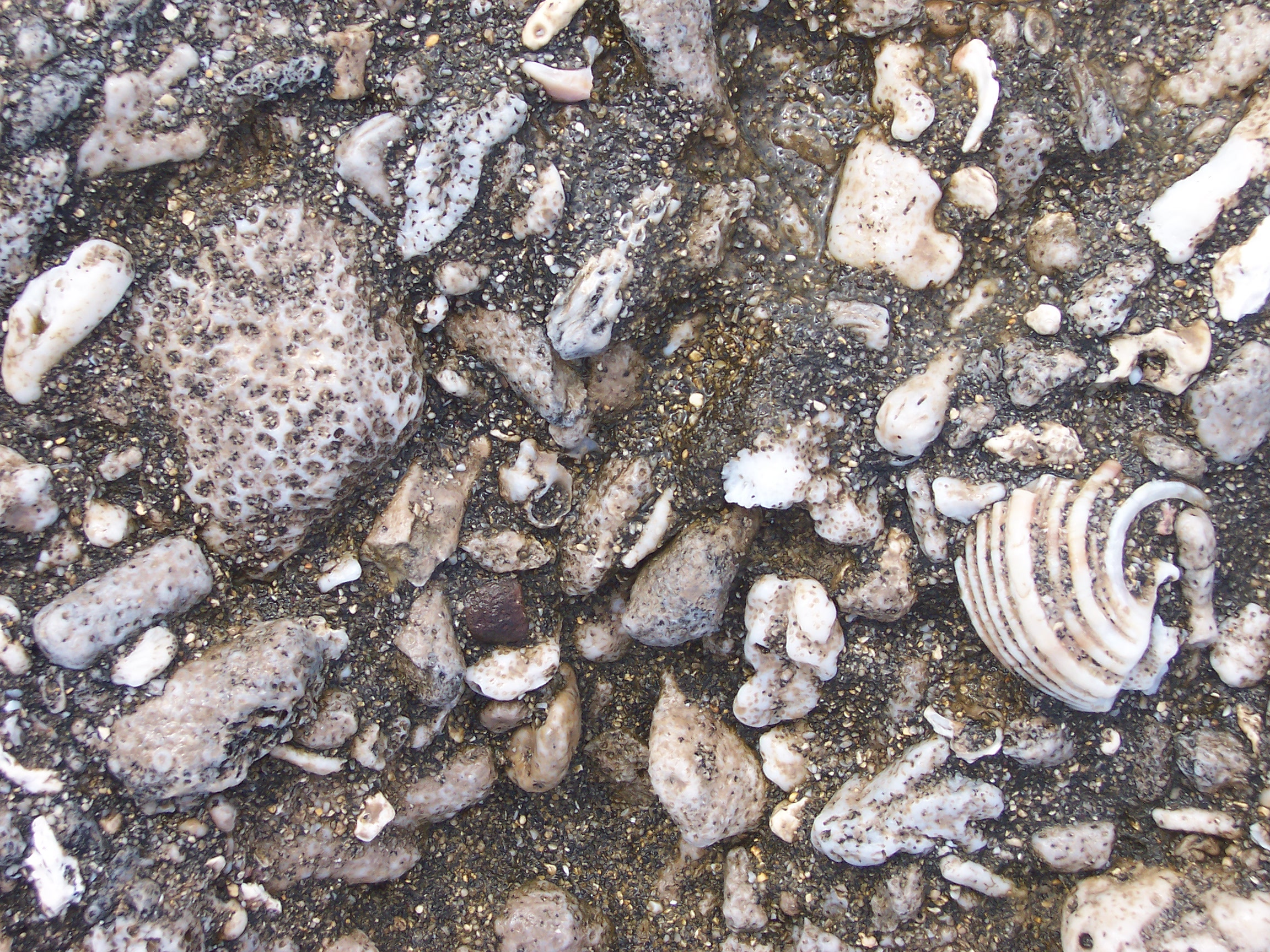
Detail showing fragments of coral and shells

Beachrock is a friable to well-cemented sedimentary rock that consists of a variable mixture of gravel-, sand-, and silt-sized sediment that is cemented with carbonate minerals and has formed along a shoreline. Depending on location, the sediment that is cemented to form beachrock can consist of a variable mixture of shells, coral fragments, rock fragments of different types, and other materials. It can also contain scattered artifacts, pieces of wood, and coconuts. Beachrock typically forms within the intertidal zone within tropical or semitropical regions. However, Quaternary beachrock is also found as far north and south as 60° latitude.

== Overview ==
Beachrock units form under a thin cover of sediment and generally overlie unconsolidated sand. They typically consist of multiple units, representing multiple episodes of cementation and exposure. The mineralogy of beachrocks is mainly high-magnesium calcite or aragonite. The main processes involved in the cementation are : supersaturation with CaCO_{3} through direct evaporation of seawater, groundwater CO_{2} degassing in the vadose zone, mixing of marine and meteoric water fluxes and precipitation of micritic calcium carbonate as a byproduct of microbiological activity.

On retreating coasts, outcrops of beachrock may be evident offshore where they may act as a barrier against coastal erosion. Beachrock presence can also induce sediment deficiency in a beach and out-synch its wave regime. Because beachrock is lithified within the intertidal zone and because it commonly forms in a few years, its potential as an indicator of past sea level is important.

== Cementation and position of beachrock ==
Beachrocks are located along the coastline in a parallel term and they are usually a few meters offshore. They are generally separated in several levels which may correspond to different generations of beachrock cementation. Thus, the older zones are located in the outer part of the formation when the younger ones are on the side of the beach, possibly under the unconsolidated sand. They also seem to have a general inclination to the sea (50–150). There are several appearances of beachrock formations which are characterized by multiple cracks and gaps. The result from this fact is an interruptible formation of separated blocks of beachrock, which may be of the same formation.

The length of beachrocks varies from meters to kilometers, its width can reach up to 300 meters and its height starts from 30 cm and reaches 3 meters.

Following the process of coastal erosion, beachrock formation may be uncovered. Coastal erosion may be the result of sea level rise or deficit in sedimentary equilibrium. One way or another, unconsolidated sand that covers the beachrock draws away and the formation is revealed. If the process of cementation continues, new beachrock would be formed in a new position in the intertidal zone. Successive phases of sea level change may result in sequential zones of beachrock.

== See also ==
- Bimini Road
- Coquina
