= Jinsuke Kageyama =

Japanese psychiatrist

Jinsuke Kageyama (影山 任佐, Kageyama Jinsuke, born 3 February 1948) is a Japanese psychiatrist. His specialties are criminal psychopathology, psychiatric history, clinical psychiatry and mental health studies. He is Professor Emeritus at Tokyo Institute of Technology and a winner of the Prize of the Japanese Association of Criminology (2002).

== Early life and education ==
Jinsuke Kageyama was born in Koriyama, Fukushima Prefecture in 1948. He graduated from the Tokyo Medical and Dental University in 1972. For two years, Kageyama received psychiatric training at the University Psychiatric Clinic.

== Career ==
In his 2011 lecture at the International Congress of the Society of Criminology Jinsuke Kageyama created, defined and proposed the terms and concepts of "Comprehensive Criminology" and "Integrative Criminology". He pointed out that E Kraepelin's psychiatric disease concept is actually based not on disease (morbid) entity, but on disease (morbid) form. Kageyama reformulated H Ey's psychiatric integrated theory Organo-dynamism as Organo-psychodynamism, which was the basis of the "Integrative Anthropology" and "Psychiatric Treatment Integration" (PTI) that Kageyama proposed. Other new concepts formulated by Kageyama include "Empathy Based Medicine (Psychiatry)" which emphasizes the important significance of "Triple E's" (Evidence, Ethics and Empathy based medicine / psychiatry).

Jinsuke Kageyama summarized his main works on violent and juvenile crime in Japan as follows:
Era of "Egopathy" (Pathology of Self) and "Modern Type Crime"; "Empty Self" and Crime of "Self-Affirmation (Self-Validation)"

1. Violent Crimes in Japan; decrease and qualitative changes
2. The homicide rate and the rates for violent crimes of various kinds have declined (Kageyama J, 1987). The remarked decreasing homicide rate in modern Japan could be caused mainly by the warless period of Japan without conscription for more than 60 years (Kageyama J, 2000).
3. Crime of "Self-Affirmation (Self-Validation)" Type (qualitative changes)
4. Taking into account the various trends and characteristics of recent crimes, the author has come up with his own naming for a model fitting the patterns, namely the "self-affirmation" or "self-validation" model. What the author means by this term is that by committing such actions, the individuals try to affirm or reaffirm their own existence to society or validate their own power. The author believes that such crimes are rooted in these motives whose underlying psychological background is "Egopathy (pathology of the self)" or the "Empty Self". These kinds of crimes occur in "postindustrial society, or the age of what Toffler refers to as the "third wave". Or we might also call it the "information society" or "cyber society".

Kageyama has published many papers and books on criminal psychopathology; political assassination ("Assassinology"), mass murder, alcohol crime, harassment, filicide，mentally disordered offenders etc. As a psychiatric expert, he has conducted more than 900 forensic examinations. His studies include the history of psychiatry and he has published books on the European, French and German history of psychiatry.

=== Academic posts ===
In 1974 he was assistant at Department of Criminal Psychiatry, Medical Research Institute, Tokyo Medical and Dental University. From 1978 to 1979, overseas researcher of Ministry of Education (Institute of Criminology at Paris University). In 1981, Doctor of Medicine (Tokyo Medical and Dental University). In 1994, professor (mental health, science on human relations) at Health Service Center and Engineering Faculty of Tokyo Institute of Technology. In 1998, professor at Tokyo Institute of Technology Graduate School. In 2012, honorary professor of Tokyo Institute of Technology; senior advisor of Kôriyama Psychiatric Research Institute. In 2014, Showa Women's University guest professor (mental health studies).

== Academic Societies ==
- President of the Japanese Association of Criminology (2012-2018)
- Director of the Japanese Psychiatrical Historical Society (1997-2018)
- Japanese Forensic Psychiatry Society councillor (2005-2018)
- Mental Health Society participation in Japan
- Honorary membership of the Japan University Health Association
- Honorary membership of Japanese Association of Mental Health
- Membre d'honneur du comité scientifique de la revue de l'Association pour la Fondation Henri Ey (les Cahiers Henri Ey) (membre correspondant de l'Association pour la Fondation Henri Ey)

== Selected publications ==
Books

- Kageyama J: Assassinology. (in Japanese) Sekai-Shoin, Tokyo, 1984
- Kageyama J: Études histriques des Délires chroniques en psychiatrie française. (en japonais) Chuohyohshso-shuppan, Tokyo, 1987
- Kageyama J: Study on Alcohol Crime. (in Japanese) Kongoh-shuppan, Tokyo, 1992
- Kageyama J: Egopathy. (in Japanese) Nihon-Hyohron-Sha, Tokyo, 1997
- Kageyama J: Era of Empty Self. (in Japanese) NHK Books, Tokyo, 1999
- Kageyama J: Study on Criminal Psychiatry; Construction of Criminal Psychopathology. (in Japanese) Kongoh-shuppan, Tokyo, 2000
- Kageyama J: New Type of Modern Crime: "Post-Nobita Syndrome". (in Japanese) Kawadeshobosinsha, Tokyo, 2000
- Kageyama J: New Type of Modern Crime: d"Self-Validation Type". (in Japanese) Kohdansha, Tokyo, 2001
- Kageyama J: Criminal Psychopothology; Its Practice and Development. (in Japanese) Kongoh-shuppan, Tokyo, 2010
- Kageyama J: Works on Criminology and History of Psychiatry. (in Japanese) vol.1, Kongoh-shuppan, Tokyo, 2015
- Kageyama J: Works on Criminology and History of Psychiatry. (in Japanese) vol.2, Kongoh-shuppan, Tokyo, 2017

Articles

- Kageyama J: Emotional Acts under Alcohol Intoxications. Act. Crim. Japon 41: 206-216, 1975
- Kageyama J, Nakata O: Alcohol Intoxication and Suicide (cases of attempted suicide under abnormal alcohol intoxication and consideration on the problem of mechanisms of aggression's inward turning) Act. Crim. Japon 48: 38-40, 1982
- Kageyama J, Yamagami A and Nakata O: Characteristics of stimulant drug abuse prisoners with advanced criminality: psychiatric study. Bull. Crim. Res. Dept. 26: 17-22, 1983 *Kageyma J: Sur l'histoire de la monomania. L'évolution psychiatrique 49: 155-162, 1984
- Kageyama J: A Case Report of Capgras Syndrome Observed in Glue-Sniffing-Induced Psychosis (Parricide). Act. Crim. Japon 45:131-132,1985. *Kageyama J: Cases and Statistical Study on Mass Murder. Act. Crim. Japon 53: 170-183, 1987
- Kageyama J, Ishii T and Nakata O: Aggression and Drinking. Act. Crim. Japon 55: 267-272, 1989
- Kageyama J: Comparative Study of Assassination Among Japan, Europe and America(USA). Act. Crim. Japon 56: 78-85, 1990
- Kageyama J and Ishii T: Comparisons of Pre- and Postwar Suicide and Homicide Rates in Japan -Aggression and Social Problem-. Act. Crim. Japon 63: 122-132, 1997
- Kageyama J, Ishii T and Hasegawa: A Statistical Study on Mentally Disordered Offenders -Comparison among Substance Dependent and Functional Psychotic Offenders-. Act. Crim. Japon 64: 10-21, 1998
- Kageyama J, Ishii T, Hasegawa N, Saito K and Kusaka K: The Nature and Diurnal Variation of Criminal Acts Committed by Patients with Mood disorders. International Journal of Law and Psychiatry 23: 53-59, 2000
- Kageyama J: Juvenile Crime and Its Psychology. Foreign Press Center, 2000
- Kageyama J: Juvenile violent Crime in Japan and "Self-Validation Type". Bulletin of Health Service Center of Tokyo Tech. 31: 59-65, 2004
- Kageyama J: Harassment; Psychopathology and practical classification. (in Japanese) Mind Science 122 (7): 6-15, 2005
- Kageyama J: Multiple Murder (Multicide) -Actuality and Future-. Act. Crim. Japon 74: 166-181, 2008
- Kageyama J: New Type of Modern Crime; "Nobita syndrome" and "Self-Validation Type". Journal of the Japan Society of Applied Science 21: 19-36, 2007
- Kageyama J: Harassment; New Modern Crime -Basic Point of View, Configurative Structure and Criminalization-. Act. Crim. Japon 75: 147-157, 2009
- Yasumi K and Kageyama J: Filicide and fatal abuse in Japan, 1994-2005: Temporal trends and regional distribution. Journal of Forensic and Legal Medicine 16: 70-75, 2009
- Kageyama J: Prevention of Primary Crime by Mentally Disordered Persons. Act. Crim. Japon 76: 130-133, 2010
