= Yang Yilun =

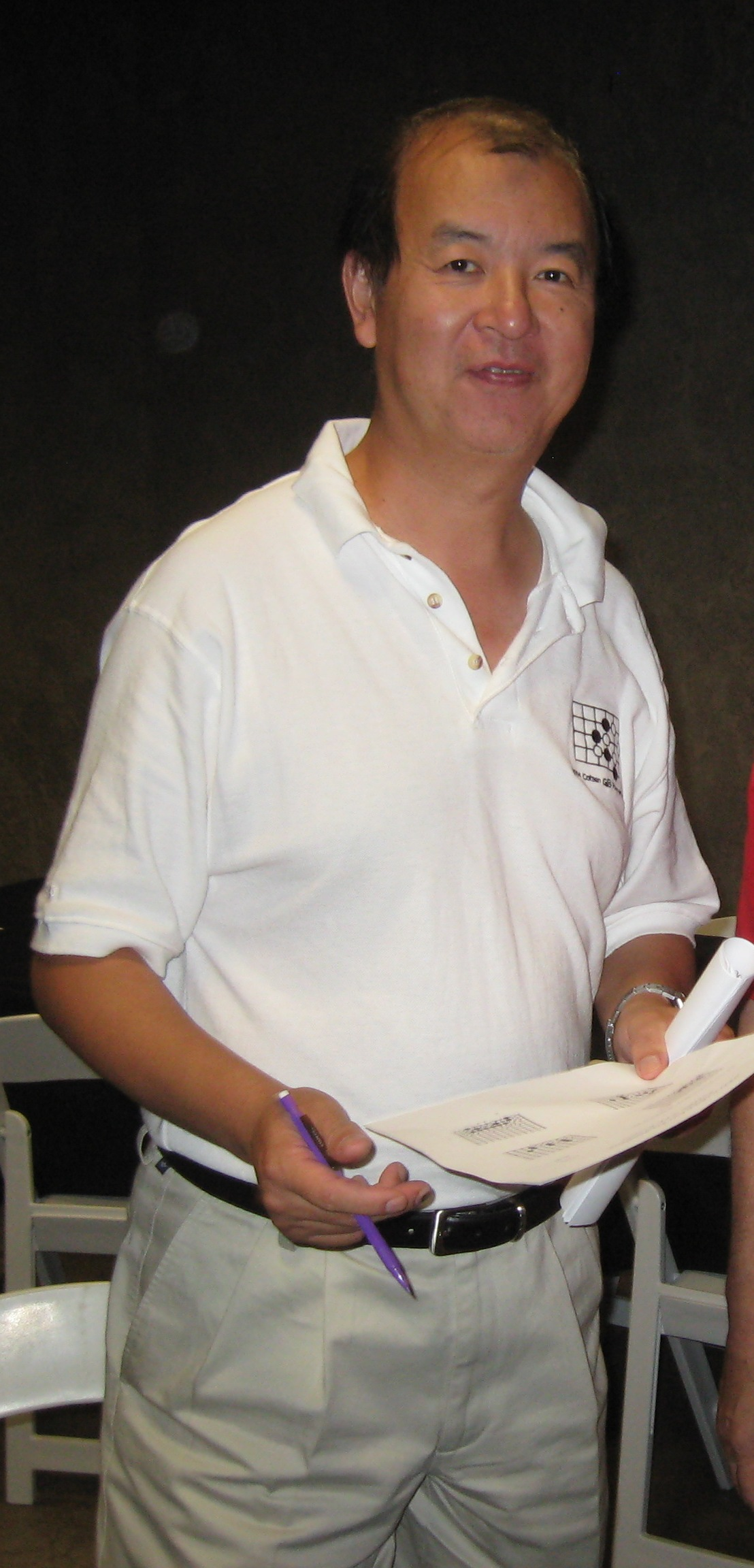
- Yang Yilun, scoring life-and-death problem submission sheet, at Cotsen Go Tournament in 2009

Personal information
- Native name: 杨以伦 (Chinese); Yáng Yǐlún (Pinyin)
- Born: May 10, 1951 (age 74) Shanghai, China

Sport
- Pupil: Chang Hao, Rui Naiwei, Hua Xueming
- Rank: 7 dan
- Affiliation: AGA

Yang Yilun (Chinese: 杨以伦; pinyin: Yáng Yǐlún; born May 10, 1951), also spelled Yang Yi-lun, is a 7 dan professional Go player, teacher, and author, with special expertise in the formulation of "tsume-go" (life-and-death) problems. For many years he has served as the professional Go player of the Cotsen Go Tournament, the largest annual Go tournament in southern California.

He became a professional in 1966, at the age of 14. He began teaching in the United States in 1986, and is the chief instructor of the American Go Institute in Los Angeles, California. He has taught hundreds of students from Canada, Germany, Hong Kong, Poland, Singapore, Taiwan, and the United States.

His co-author Philip Straus wrote: "Mr. Yang has a comprehensive understanding of the meaning of josekis. More importantly, he has developed a method to transfer that understanding to amateur players who grope about in a fog of confusion when trying to puzzle out even the simplest joseki."

He has created hundreds of life-and-death problems. He also has translated multiple Go books from Japanese into Chinese.

He enjoys "sports and cooking Chinese food."

== Bibliography ==
- Yilun Yang's Go Puzzles: Volume1: Life and death by the Numbers. 2001.
- Yilun Yang's Go Puzzles: Volume2: Life and Death in Chinese Characters.
- Fundamental Principles of Go. 2004.
- Yang, Yilun; Dee, James (1997). Yang Yilun's Ingenious Life and Death Puzzles.
- Tricks in Joseki. 2001.
- Yang, Yilun; Straus, Phil (1995). Whole Board Thinking in Joseki, Volume 1: 3-4 point, low kakari.
- Yang, Yilun; Straus, Phil (1997). Whole Board Thinking in Joseki, Volume Two: 3-4 point, high kakari & far kakari.
