= Janice Kim =

American Go player

- Born: 1969 (age 56–57); Illinois, U.S.
- Education: New York University
- Occupations: Businesswoman, professional Go player

Janice Kim is an American professional Go player, author, and business-owner.

== Early life and education ==
Kim was born in Illinois in 1969 and grew up in New Mexico. She earned a bachelor's degree from New York University.

== Career ==
As a teenager, she studied Go in Korea under Jeong Soo-hyon. She represented the U.S. in the first World Youth Go Championship in 1985, placing second. In 1986, she played for the U.S. again and won the event. In 1987, she became the first westerner to be accepted by the Korea Baduk Association as a pro. She remains one of only five western women ever to attain professional status (with Joanne Missingham, Svetlana Shikshina, Diana Koszegi and Mariya Zakharchenko).

In 1997, she created Samarkand, an online store for go-related items. In 2003, she was promoted to a 3-Dan professional Go player, the first female westerner to do so. Kim is the author of the Getting Go articles that accompany installments of Hikaru No Go, a manga about a boy who releases the spirit of a famous Go player, in the American magazine Shonen Jump. She also writes occasionally for The American Go E-Journal.

== Personal life ==
Kim lived in New York City, Denver, and San Francisco Bay Area before settling in New Mexico. In 2009, she was fourth in the World Poker Tour Women's Poker Championship at the Bellagio in Las Vegas. After retiring from competition she currently teaches Go and has authored more books, most recently Vital Endgame in 2024.

== Bibliography ==
- Learn to Play Go: A Master's Guide to the Ultimate Game (ISBN 0-9644796-1-3)
- Learn to Play Go: Volume II: The Way of the Moving Horse (ISBN 0-9644796-2-1)
- Learn to Play Go: Volume III: The Dragon Style (ISBN 0-9644796-3-X)
- Learn to Play Go: Volume IV: Battle Strategies (ISBN 0-9644796-4-8)
- Learn to Play Go: Volume V: The Palace of Memory (ISBN 0-9644796-5-6)
- Vital Endgame: The Shape of Things to Come (ISBN 979-8871821121)

== See also ==
- American Go Association
- Go professional
- Go players
