= Yoshiteru Abe =

Japanese Go player

Personal information
- Native name: 安倍吉輝 (Japanese); アベヨシテル (Japanese)
- Full name: Yoshiteru Abe
- Born: September 28, 1941 Miyagi, Japan
- Died: October 25, 2009 (aged 68) Japan

Sport
- Rank: 9 dan
- Affiliation: Nihon Ki-in, Tokyo branch

Yoshiteru Abe (安倍 吉輝, Abe Yoshiteru; September 28, 1941 – October 25, 2009) was a Japanese professional 9 dan Go player.

== Biography ==
Yoshiteru Abe was born in Miyagi Prefecture, Japan and became an insei in 1954. As a member of the Nihon Ki-in, he obtained the rank of 9 dan in 1986. Abe tutored several students, including Masaaki Kanagawa and Jo Kenmochi, as well as his daughter, Yumiko Okada.

== Bibliography ==
- Abe, Yoshiteru, Dramatic Moments On the Go Board, Yutopian Enterprises, 2004.
- Abe, Yoshiteru, Step Up to a Higher Level, Yutopian Enterprises, 2004.

== Awards ==
- Journalist Club Prize.
