= Masaaki Nakagawa =

Japanese photographer

Masaaki Nakagawa (中川 政昭, Nakagawa Masaaki; 1943–2005) was a renowned Japanese photographer.
