= Masaaki Kanagawa =

Japanese Go player

Personal information
- Native name: 金川正明 (Japanese)
- Full name: Masaaki Kanagawa
- Born: June 26, 1955 (age 70) Yokohama City, Japan

Sport
- Teacher: Yoshiteru Abe
- Rank: 7 dan
- Affiliation: Nihon Ki-in, Tokyo

Masaaki Kanagawa (金川 正明, Masaaki Kanagawa; born 26 June 1955) is a Japanese professional 7 dan Go player.

== Biography ==
Under the tutorage of Yoshiteru Abe, Kanagawa turned professional in 1975, and reached 2 dan in the same year. Kanagawa obtained the rank of 7 dan in 1991.
