= Masaaki Kimura =

Japanese academic

- 木村 政昭
- Born: November 6, 1940 (age 85); Japan
- Education: University of Tokyo
- Known for: Research on the Okinawa Trough, exploration of underwater structures (Yonaguni Monument)
- Scientific career
- Fields: Geology, Marine geology, Geophysics, Seismology, Volcanology, Marine archaeology
- Workplaces: University of the Ryukyus, University of Tokyo, Geological Survey of Japan, Agency of Industrial Science and Technology, Columbia University

Masaaki Kimura (木村 政昭, Kimura Masaaki; born 6 November 1940) is a Japanese geologist and a professor emeritus from the Faculty of Science of the University of the Ryukyus, Okinawa, Japan.

== Biography ==
Masaaki Kimura graduated in science at the Faculty of Fisheries of the University of Tokyo (1963) and obtained a Doctorate in marine geology (1968). He has worked for the University of Tokyo's Ocean Research Institute, the Geological Survey of Japan, the Agency of Industrial Science and Technology of the Ministry of International Trade and Industry of Japan, and Columbia University's Lamont–Doherty Earth Observatory. He taught at the University of the Ryukyus from 1977 to 2002. He has since retired from that University and is now general director of Marine Science and Culture Heritage Research Association.

== Research ==
His specialties are marine geology, geophysics, seismology, volcanology, and marine archaeology. He has extensively researched the formation of the Okinawa Trough, and claimed to have predicted the volcanic eruptions in Miyake Island (1983), Izu Ōshima (1986), and Mount Unzen (1991).

Apart from his geological research, Kimura is best known to the world for his exploration of underwater structures which he claims, and some other scholars agree, are ruins of an ancient civilization. These structures were identified by local divers in 1986. In 1992 he studied the so-called Yonaguni Monument and other formations off the coast of Yonaguni, the westernmost of the Ryukyus. In a report given to the 21st Pacific Science Congress in 2007 he suggested that it had been built 2,000 to 3,000 years ago as the sea level then was close to current levels.

== Publications ==
1. Kimura, Masaaki (1976). "Major Magmatic Activity as a Key to Predicting Large Earthquakes Along the Sagami Trough, Japan". Nature. 260 (5547): 131–133. Bibcode:1976Natur.260..131K. doi:10.1038/260131b0. S2CID 4279192.
2. Okuda, Yoshihisa; Kimura, Masaaki; Honza, Eiichi (1976). "Geological Structure of the Izu Ogasawara Arc and Trench". Cruise Report, Izu-Ogasawara (Bonin) Arc and Trench Investigations. 5: 29–45, 63–66.
3. Kimura, Masaaki (1978). "Significant Eruptive Activities Related to Large Interplate Earthquakes in the Northwestern Pacific Margin". Journal of Physics of the Earth. 26 (Supplement): S557–S573. doi:10.4294/jpe1952.26.Supplement_S557.
4. Shiono, Kiyoji; Mikumo, Takeshi; Ishikawa, Yuzo (1978). "Volcanism and Seismicity in the Kyushu and Ryukyu Islands Areas". Journal of Physics of the Earth. 28 (1): 17–43. doi:10.4294/jpe1952.28.17. hdl:2433/193392.
5. Kimura, Masaaki; Honza, Eiichi; Miyamoto, Motoyuki (1979). "Submarine Geology around the Southern Ryukyu Islands, with Special Reference to the Okinawa Trough". Geological Studies of the Ryukyu Islands. 4: 79–93.
6. Kimura, Masaaki (1979). "Submarine Tectonics Around the Japanese Islands, with Special Reference to Tectonics of the Sagami Trough". Geological Studies of the Japanese Islands. 5: 45–67.
7. Kimura, Masaaki (1981). "Backarc Volcanism and Rifting in the Okinawa Trough". Marine and Petroleum Geology. 2: 222–240. doi:10.1016/0264-8172(85)90012-1.
8. "Formation of the Okinawa Trough". Marine and Petroleum Geology. 1985.
9. Letouzey, Jean; Kimura, Masaaki (1985). "Okinawa Trough genesis: structure and evolution of a backarc basin developed in a continent". Marine and Petroleum Geology. 2 (2): 111. Bibcode:1985MarPG...2..111L. doi:10.1016/0264-8172(85)90002-9.
10. "Back Arc Rifting in the Okinawa Trough". Marine and Petroleum Geology. 1986.
11. "Okinawa Trough Genesis: Structure and Evolution of a Backarc Basin Developed in a Continent". Tectonophysics. 1986.
12. "Origin of the Okinawa Trough". Tectonophysics. 1986.
13. "The Okinawa Trough: Genesis of a Back Arc Basin Developing Continental Margin". Tectonophysics. 1986.
14. Sibuet, Jean-Claude; Masaaki Kimura; et al. (1987). "Back arc extension in the Okinawa Trough" (PDF). Journal of Geophysical Research. 92 (B13): 14041–14063. Bibcode:1987JGR....9214041S. doi:10.1029/JB092iB13p14041. S2CID 55267835.
15. "Geostructure of the Okinawa Trough". Marine and Petroleum Geology. 1988.
16. "Submarine Geology of the Nansei Islands". Modern Geology. 1988.
17. Honma, Hiroji; Kusakabe, Minoru; Kagami, Hiroo; Iizumi, Shigeru; Sakai, Hitoshi; Kodama, Yukio; Kimura, Masaaki (1991). "Major and trace element chemistry and D/H, 18O/16O, 87Sr/86Sr and 143Nd/144Nd ratios of rocks from the spreading center of the Okinawa Trough, a marginal back arc basin". Geochemical Journal. 25 (2): 121. Bibcode:1991GeocJ..25..121H. doi:10.2343/geochemj.25.121.
18. "Morphology and Geology of the Magellan Trough Area in the Central Pacific". Geology and Offshore Mineral Resources of the Central Pacific Basin. 1992.
19. Oshida, Atsushi; Tamaki, Kensaku; Kimura, Masaaki (1992). "Origin of the Magnetic Anomalies in the Southern Okinawa Trough". Journal of Geomagnetism and Geoelectricity. 44 (5): 345. Bibcode:1992JGG....44..345O. doi:10.5636/jgg.44.345.
20. "Relationship between the West Pacific Rift System and mid oceanic ridges". Abstracts, 29th International Geological Congress. 1992.
21. "Tectonic Evolution of the East China Sea and the Okinawa Trough". Geotectonic Framework of the East China Sea. 1992.
22. Science on Eruptions and Earthquakes. Ronso-sha. 1993.
23. Volcanic Belts and Volcano-Tectonic Structure of the East Asia. Geological Committee for Mineral Resources of the Russian Federation Government Far Eastern Research Institute of Raw Materials. 1993.
24. Prediction of the Shock. Seishun-shuppan. 1994.
25. "Active Rift System in the Okinawa Trough and Its Northeastern Continuation". Marine Geology. 1995.
26. "Quaternary Paleo-Geography of the Ryukyu Arc". Journal of Geography. 105 (3). 1996.
27. "Construction and Breakup of the Ryukyu Landbridge and Their Tectonic Implications as Derived from Precise Bottom Topography and Regional Gravity Anomaly in the Southwestern Part of the Japanese Islands". Journal of Geography. 105 (3). 1996.
28. "Neotectonic Development of the Okinawa Trough and the Ryukyu Arc". Journal of Geography. 105 (3). 1996.
29. Kimura, Masaaki (1996). "Ryukyu in the Late Quaternary". Journal of Geography (in Japanese). 105 (3): 261–268.
30. "Seismicity and Crustal Movement of Ryukyu Arc". Proceedings of International Workshop on Scientific Use of Submarine Cables - Marine Geophysical Research Using Undersea Cables. 1997.
31. "Surface Deformation and Origin of Large Scale Tsunami in the Southwesternmost Part of the Ryukyu Arc". Proceedings of International Workshop on Scientific Use of Submarine Cables - Marine Geophysical Research Using Undersea Cables. 1997.
32. A Continent Lost in the Pacific Ocean - Riddle of the Submarine Ruins in the Ryukyu Islands. Tokyo. 1998.
33. "Geochemical and Sr Nd isotopic characteristics of volcanic rocks from the Okinawa Trough and Ryukyu Arc: Implications for the evolution of a young, intracontinental back arc basin". Journal of Geophysical Research. 1999.
34. "Ancient Megalithic Construction Beneath the Sea off Ryukyu Islands in Japan, Submerged by Post Glacial Sea level Change". IEEE Conference Publication. 2004.
35. Alam, Md. Mahmudul; Kimura, Masaaki (2004). "Statistical analysis of time distance relationship between volcanic eruptions and great earthquakes in Japan". Earth, Planets and Space. 56 (2): 179. Bibcode:2004EP&S...56..179A. doi:10.1186/BF03353402.
36. "Frequency Attribute Study of Seismic Data". Journal of Geophysics and Engineering. 2005.
37. "The Mid Niigata Prefecture Earthquake in 2004: A view from Statistical Analysis". Earth, Planets and Space. 2005.
38. Matsumoto Tsuyoshi; Shinjo Ryuichi; Nakamura Mamoru; Omori Tamotsu; Li Shoko; Kyo Konju; Sibuet Jean-Claude; Imamura Makiko; Ishii Toshie (2005). "New topographic map of the southwestern Okinawa Trough". Shinkai Shinpojiumu Yokoshu. 21: 115–116.
39. "Submarine, across arc normal fault system in the southwest Ryukyu Arc: trigger of the 1771 tsunami hazard?". Eos, Transactions, American Geophysical Union. 87 (52): F2051. 2006.
40. Masaaki Kimura (2001). Diving Survey Report for Submarine Ruins Off Yonaguni, Japan (Report). University of the Ryukyus.
41. Masaaki Kimura. "Sunken Citadel off Yonaguni Island". Ancient American. 6 (39).
