= Marine archaeology in the Gulf of Khambhat =

Archaeological exploration along Western Indian coast

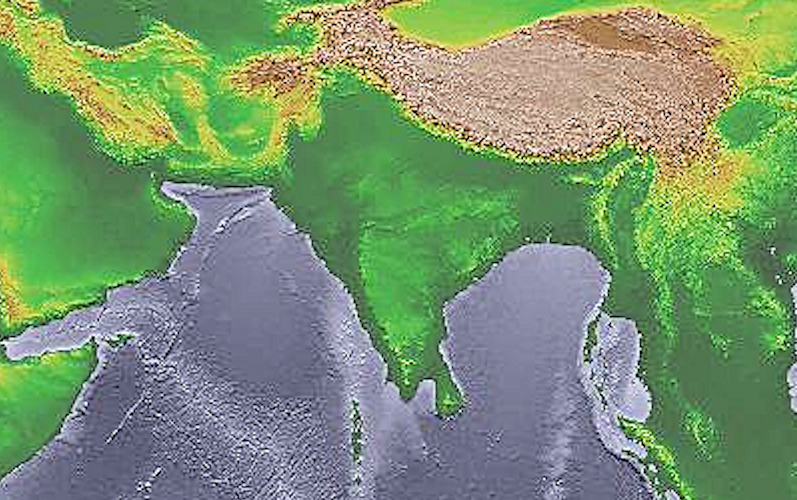
Global sea levels during the Last Ice Age (South Asia)

Marine Archeology in the Gulf of Khambhat - earlier known as Gulf of Cambay - centers around controversial findings made in December 2000 by the National Institute of Ocean Technology (NIOT) under the Gulf of Khambhat, a bay on the Arabian Sea on the west coast of India. The structures and artifacts discovered by NIOT are the subject of contention. The major disputes surrounding the Gulf of Khambhat Cultural Complex (GKCC) are claims about the existence of submerged city-like structures, the difficulty associating dated artifacts with the site itself, and disputes about whether stone artifacts recovered at the site are actually geofacts or artifacts. One major complaint is that artifacts at the site were recovered by dredging, instead of being recovered during a controlled archeological excavation. This leads archeologists to claim that these artifacts cannot be definitively tied to the site. Because of this problem, prominent archeologists reject a piece of wood that was recovered by dredging and dated to 7500 BC as having any significance in dating the site. The surveys were followed up in the following years and two palaeo channels of old rivers were discovered in the middle of the Khambhat area under 20–40 m (66–131 ft) water depths, at a distance of about 20 km (12 mi) from the present day coast.

== Initial discovery ==
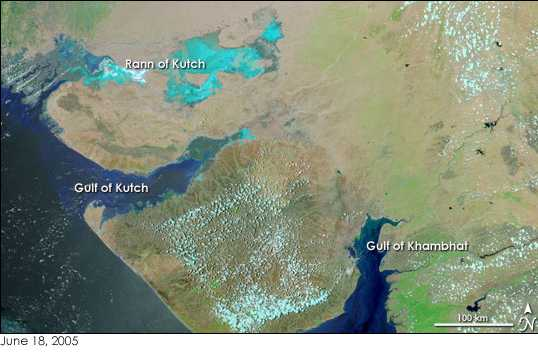
Gulf of Khambhat on the right. Image NASA Earth Observatory

On 19 May 2001, India's Union Minister for Human Resource Development, Science and Technology division, Murli Manohar Joshi, announced that the ruins of an ancient civilization had been discovered off the coast of Gujarat, in the Gulf of Khambhat. The site was discovered by NIOT while they performed routine pollution studies using sonar, and was described as an area of regularly spaced geometric structures. It is located 20 km (12 mi) from the Gujarat coast, spans 94 km (58 mi), and can be found at a depth of 30–40 meters (98–131 ft). In his announcement, Joshi represented the site as an urban settlement that pre-dates the Indus Valley civilization. Further descriptions of the site by Joshi describe it as containing regularly spaced dwellings, a granary, a bath, a citadel, and a drainage system. However it was later on 22 May, reported that the discovery has not been dated and the discovery (for example, great baths) resembles the Harappan civilization dating 4,000 years ago. Furthermore, the Indus civilization port Lothal is located at the head, Gulf of Khambhat.

== Follow-up excavations ==
A follow-up investigation was conducted by NIOT in November 2001, which included dredging to recover artifacts and sonar scans to detect structures. Among the artifacts recovered were a piece of wood, pottery shards, weathered stones initially described as hand tools, fossilized bones, and a tooth. Artifacts were sent to the National Geophysical Research Institute (NGRI) in Hyderabad, India, the Birbal Sahni Institute of Paleobotany (BSIP) in Lucknow, India, and the Physical Research Laboratory in Ahmedabad, India. The piece of wood was carbon dated to an age of 9,500 years old.

NIOT returned for further investigation in the Gulf from October 2002 to January 2003. During these excavations, NIOT reported finding two paleochannels flanked by rectangular and square basement-like features. Artifacts were recovered by means of dredging, including pottery sherds, microliths, wattle and daub remains, and hearth materials. These artifacts were sent for dating at the laboratories of Manipur University and Oxford University. The wattle and daub remains are composed of locally available clay, reed, husk, pottery pieces, and pieces of fresh water shell. The wattle and daub also shows evidence of partial burning.

The most recent work in the Gulf of Khambhat took place from October 2003 to January 2004 and was primarily a geologic study. Techniques used during this investigation include bathymetry survey, sub-bottom survey, side-scan survey, and magnetic survey. One of the major findings from this investigation concerns the orientation of sand ripples at the site. NIOT researchers claim that there are two sets of ripples visible at the site; one set is a natural feature formed by tidal currents, while they say the other set has formed in relation to underlying structural features.

=== Carbon dates ===
One of the main controversies surrounding the GKCC is the dated piece of wood. D. P. Agrawal, chairman of the Paleoclimate Group and founder of Carbon-14 testing facilities in India stated in an article in Frontline Magazine that the piece was dated twice, at separate laboratories. The NGRI in Hyderabad returned a date of 7190 BC and the BSIP in Hannover returned a date of 7545-7490 BC. Some archeologists, Agrawal in particular, contest that the discovery of an ancient piece of wood does not imply the discovery of an ancient civilization. Agrawal argues that the wood piece is a common find, given that 20,000 years ago the Arabian Sea was 100 meters (330 ft) lower than its current level, and that the gradual sea level rise submerged entire forests.

=== Artifacts ===
Another controversial issue are the artifacts retrieved from the site during the various excavations. It is disputed that many of the items that have been identified as artifacts by the NIOT investigators are actually man-made. Instead their artificial nature is contested and they are argued to be stones of natural origin.

Researchers report finding shards of pottery as indicative of hand-made and wheel-turned pottery traditions. The reported shards have simple rims with small incised lines. All of the pottery fragments found so far are small or miniature shards. Part of the controversy is that some of the "shards" are natural geofacts and others lack any proof of any connections, as with the dated pieces of wood, with the purported "ruins" found by NIOT researchers. In addition, their small size also raises the possibility that the real shards have been transported from elsewhere by local, strong tidal currents. But if the pottery is genuine, researchers say it should show some similarities to Harappan pottery, which is typically red and black and stamped with seals. Based on the current pottery collection, a stylistic continuity of Harappan civilization isn't evident. The small size of the artifact collection makes it difficult to analyse the pottery conclusively.

=== Geography ===
The Gulf of Khambhat was formed by a major rift that resulted in a down sliding of the Khambhat region. The area is very tectonically active today, and several faults can be found in the gulf. Periodic earthquakes also occur here. This knowledge has led several archeologists to state that the site is not in a secure enough context to be reliably dated. Because of the tectonic activity and strong currents, these archeologists claim that there is not sufficient stratification to be sure the recovered artifacts can be associated with the site.

=== Collection methods ===
Complaints have arisen because NIOT recovered artefacts by dredging the sea floor of the site. This method might allow errant artefacts to be collected along with those that actually correlate with the site. Analysing stratification is virtually impossible with this method as well.

== See also ==
- Dwaraka Kingdom
- Adam's Bridge
- Archaeological Survey of India
- Mahabharata
- Indology
- Yonaguni Monument
