= Masaki Station =

Masaki Station is the name of two train stations in Japan:

- Masaki Station (Ehime) (松前駅)
- Masaki Station (Miyazaki) (真幸駅)
