= Yoshinohana Masaki =

Japanese sumo wrestler

Personal information
- Native name: 義ノ花 成典
- Born: Masanori Aikawa; 4 September 1943 (age 83) Taito, Tokyo, Japan
- Height: 1.89 m (6 ft 2 1/2 in)
- Weight: 165 kg (364 lb)

Sport
- Sport: Sumo
- Retired: July, 1973
- Heya: Dewanoumi
- Record: 527-533-26
- Debut: May, 1959
- Highest rank: Maegashira 1 (November, 1966)
- Elder name: Inagawa
- Championships: 2 (Jūryō); 1 (Makushita); 1 (Sandanme); 1 (Jonokuchi)
- Special Prizes: Fighting Spirit (1)
- Gold Stars: 1 (Tochinoumi)
- Updated on June 2020

Yoshinohana Masaki (born 4 September 1943 as Masanori Aikawa) is a former sumo wrestler from Taitō, Tokyo, Japan. He made his professional debut in September May 1959, and reached the top division in November 1964. His highest rank was maegashira 1. Upon retirement from active competition he became an elder in the Japan Sumo Association, under the name Inagawa. He reached the Sumo Association's mandatory retirement age in September 2008.

== Career record ==
Yoshinohana Masaki
Year	January Hatsu basho, Tokyo	March Haru basho, Osaka	May Natsu basho, Tokyo	July Nagoya basho, Nagoya	September Aki basho, Tokyo	November Kyūshū basho, Fukuoka
1959	x	x	(Maezumo)	West Jonokuchi #22; 8–0; Champion	East Jonidan #41; 5–3	East Jonidan #6; 4–4
1960	West Jonidan #7; 1–7	West Jonidan #13; 3–5	East Jonidan #19; 3–5	West Jonidan #26; 3–4	West Jonidan #31; 4–3	East Sandanme #111; 4–3
1961	East Sandanme #95; 4–3	East Sandanme #71; 3–4	West Sandanme #84; 4–3	West Sandanme #62; 4–3	West Sandanme #47; 4–3	East Sandanme #36; 4–3
1962	West Sandanme #19; 1–2–4	East Sandanme #33; Sat out due to injury 0–0–7	East Sandanme #68; Sat out due to injury 0–0–7	West Sandanme #87; 4–3	East Sandanme #75; 7–0; Champion	East Makushita #87; 7–0; Champion
1963	West Makushita #8; 4–3	East Makushita #5; 5–2	East Makushita #1; 5–3	West Jūryō #16; 9–6	West Jūryō #11; 6–9	West Jūryō #16; 9–6
1964	East Jūryō #8; 7–8	West Jūryō #9; 9–6	East Jūryō #6; 9–6	East Jūryō #3; 9–6	West Jūryō #1; 12–3; Champion	West Maegashira #10; 6–7–2
1965	West Maegashira #12; 8–7	East Maegashira #9; 6–9	West Maegashira #11; 6–9	West Maegashira #14; 6–9	West Jūryō #1; 6–9	West Jūryō #4; 10–5
1966	West Jūryō #1; 8–7	West Maegashira #15; 9–6	West Maegashira #12; 8–7	West Maegashira #10; 8–7	East Maegashira #7; 10–5	East Maegashira #1; 6–9 ★
1967	East Maegashira #3; 7–8	West Maegashira #3; 4–11	East Maegashira #10; 10–5	West Maegashira #2; 7–8	West Maegashira #3; 5–10	West Maegashira #7; 10–5
1968	West Maegashira #1; 0–9–6	West Maegashira #11; 6–9	East Jūryō #2; 13–2; Champion	East Maegashira #7; 8–7	East Maegashira #5; 6–9	East Maegashira #10; 8–7
1969	East Maegashira #8; 9–6	West Maegashira #4; 3–12	West Maegashira #9; 8–7	West Maegashira #6; 4–11	East Maegashira #12; 5–10	East Jūryō #3; 6–9
1970	West Jūryō #6; 6–9	West Jūryō #8; 10–5	West Jūryō #3; 9–6	East Jūryō #1; 8–7	West Maegashira #12; 9–6	West Maegashira #5; 6–9
1971	West Maegashira #8; 7–8	East Maegashira #11; 9–6	West Maegashira #6; 7–8	West Maegashira #7; 10–5; F	East Maegashira #1; 4–11	East Maegashira #7; 1–14
1972	East Jūryō #3; 6–9	East Jūryō #5; 6–9	East Jūryō #9; 8–7	East Jūryō #6; 9–6	East Jūryō #1; 10–5–PPPP	West Maegashira #11; 6–9
1973	West Jūryō #1; 9–6	West Maegashira #11; 2–13	West Jūryō #7; 6–9	West Jūryō #11; Retired; 2–7–6		
Record given as wins–losses–absences Top division champion Top division runner-up Retired Lower divisions Non-participation Sanshō key: F=Fighting spirit; O=Outstanding performance; T=Technique Also shown: ★=Kinboshi; P=Playoff(s); Divisions: Makuuchi — Jūryō — Makushita — Sandanme — Jonidan — Jonokuchi Makuuchi ranks: Yokozuna — Ōzeki — Sekiwake — Komusubi — Maegashira

== See also ==
- Glossary of sumo terms
- List of past sumo wrestlers
- List of sumo tournament second division champions
