= Masaaki Niwa =

Engineer

Masaaki Niwa from the University of Tsukuba, Tennoudai, Tsukuba, Japan was named Fellow of the Institute of Electrical and Electronics Engineers (IEEE) in 2013 for contributions to CMOS technology using high dielectric constant materials and metal gate.
