= Geofact =

Portmanteau of geology and artifact

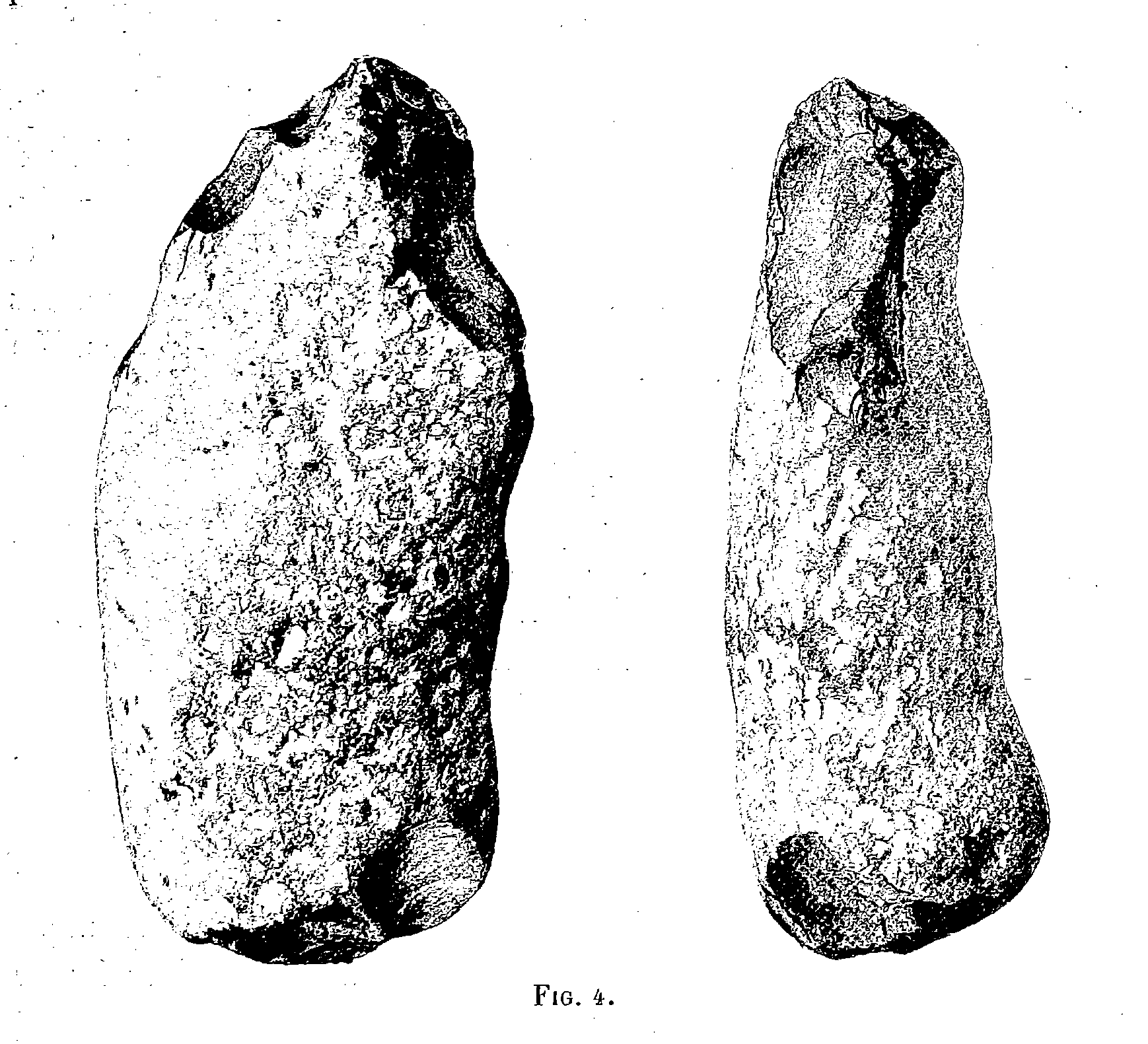
Eolith from France. Once believed to be an early hammerstone, in 1905 Marcellin Boule debunked its man-made status

A geofact (a portmanteau of geology and artifact) is a natural stone formation that is difficult to distinguish from a man-made artifact. Geofacts could be fluvially reworked and be misinterpreted as an artifact, especially when compared to Paleolithic artifacts.

Possible examples include several purported prominent ancient artifacts, such as the Venus of Berekhat Ram and the Venus of Tan-Tan. These are thought by many in the archaeological community to be geofacts. A site which shows an abundance of what are likely geofacts is the Gulf of Cambay.

Geofacts can be distinguished from lithic debitage, through experiments and comparisons. Separating geofacts from artifacts is a challenge that archaeologists can face while excavating a site.

== Origins ==
Hans-Peter Schulz describes geofacts as being multi-shaped rocks that can be found while archaeologists are trying to find true artifacts during past glacial periods. Glacial periods such as the Eemian interglacial and the Middle Weichselian glaciation located in the northern parts of the world melted and began to move rocks from their original areas while they scraped everything around them. The rock movement created sometimes weapon like spears from smaller rocks and appear as artifacts but instead are just a product of glacial melting. Another element Schulz explained is the mixing of natural and salt water during the glaciations, which changed sediment locations within rocks such as the Susiluola cave located in Finland. Once the ice melted the sediment and ice created some artificial markings on pebble sized rocks. Some elements that could morph rock shapes in caves include sandstone, siltstone and quartzite creating a kinetic process of shaping the rocks. There are measurements Schulz created to distinguish a geofact such as blow angles from a sandstone or quartzite rock with a limit between 45 and 90 degrees, and if the abrasions were rounded these are considered geofacts.

== Archeological errors ==
Artifacts are interpreted as geofacts so often that they have entire articles filled with correcting excavations. Archeological geologist Paul V. Henrich (2002) corrects journalist Graham Hancock in article, “Artifacts or Geofacts? Alternative Interpretations of Items from the Gulf of Cambay” of his alleged artifacts found in the Gulf of Cambay, India is geofacts. Henrich illustrates in pictures that these designed artifacts were a combination of cement, layered coarse and fine laminated sand stacked tightly together from lamented lake silts with enough porosity appearing rigid to look like a human design. Other corrections Henrich made were Hancock's “Cambay pendants” large flat rock objects with a hole in between assumed as jewelry but are naturally formed holes created by marine organisms. Henrich claims during excavations the team should have a geologist on site because they are experts in rock formations to help distinguish between an artifact and geofact.

Artifacts mixed with human remains can certainly contain mixtures of geofacts. In the article, “The alleged Early Paleolithic artefacts are in reality geofacts: a revision of the site of Konczyce Weilkie 4 in the Moravian Gate, South Poland,” Wiśniewski et al. (2014), explain when geofacts are mixed with artifacts in a fluvial gravel pit it becomes very difficult to distinguish between the two. Another issue Wisniewski questioned is if the site was livable during the Paleolithic period because artifacts are mobile and therefore would not be found in situ however, rocks that are native to the area would usually be a geofact. A helpful hint to decide if an item is an artifact or geofact is if there are multiple rocks that have similar edges and shapes and this type of rock is in its natural environment then it is most likely a geofact. An argument the previous excavators claimed was that some rocks were found over 140 meters from their original environment meaning they could have been artifacts moved by humans. However this was quickly refuted because evidence in glacial moraines and fluvial-glacial deposits caused many rocks to move a similar distance from their original environment.

== See also ==
- Klerksdorp spheres – Natural nodule-like rock concretions
- Manuport -- a natural object picked up and transported by humans
