= Toshiro Kageyama =

Japanese Go player

Personal information
- Native name: 影山利郎 (Japanese)
- Full name: Toshiro Kageyama
- Born: June 21, 1926 Shizuoka, Japan
- Died: July 31, 1990 (aged 64)

Sport
- Rank: 7 dan

Toshiro Kageyama (影山利郎, Kageyama Toshirō; June 21, 1926 – July 31, 1990) was a professional Go player.

He is well known in the Western go world for his book Lessons in the Fundamentals of Go.

== Biography ==
Kageyama was born in Shizuoka Prefecture, Japan. In 1948, he won the biggest amateur Go tournament in Japan, the All-Amateur Honinbo. The year after that, he passed the pro exam.

For two years straight, Kageyama was runner up for the Prime Minister Cup. First, against Otake Hideo, then Hoshino Toshi. His style was a very calm one with deep calculations, similar to what Ishida Yoshio would use later on. The greatest accomplishment of his life, in his own opinion, was beating Rin Kaiho in the Prime Minister Cup semi-finals. At the time, Rin was the Meijin, the top player in Japan. Kageyama gave a commentary on this game in his book "Lessons in the Fundamentals of Go", where he wrote

Experiences like the following are what make it impossible to stop playing Go. The year was 1965. I had advanced to the semifinals of the Prime Minister Cup, and in the semifinal game I scored the upset of my life by beating the current Meijin, Rin Kaiho. Even now the memory is so intoxicating that I am embarrassed to think what this commentary is going to sound like, but I don't care. This game is one of my lifetime masterpieces.

== Promotion record ==
Rank	Year	Notes
1 dan	1949	
2 dan	1950	
3 dan	1951	
4 dan	1953	
5 dan	1955	
6 dan	1961	
7 dan	1977	
8 dan	—	
9 dan	—	

== Runners-up ==
Title	Years Lost
Defunct	2
(Japan) Prime Minister Cup	1965, 1966

== Awards ==
- Takamatsu-no-miya Prize once (1967)

== Bibliography ==
- Lessons in the Fundamentals of Go ISBN 4-906574-28-9
- Kage's Secret Chronicles of Handicap Go ISBN 4-87187-017-0
