= Masaki (surname) =

Masaki (written: 真崎, 正木, 真咲 or 柾) is a Japanese surname. Notable people with the surname include:

- Gorō Masaki (柾 悟郎, born 1957), Japanese science fiction writer
- Jinzaburō Masaki (真崎 甚三郎, 1876–1956), Japanese general
- Kazuki Masaki (真崎 一輝, born 2000), Japanese motorcycle racer
- Kento Masaki (正木 健人, born 1987), Japanese Paralympic judoka
- Mori Masaki (真崎 守, born 1941), Japanese manga artist, screenwriter and anime director
- Ran Masaki (真咲 乱, born 1965), Japanese AV idol, actress and gravure model
- Masaki Sōzaburō (正木 惣三郎), Japanese samurai and potter
- Yoshimi Masaki (正木 嘉美, born 1962), Japanese judoka
- Yuka Masaki (真崎 ゆか, born 1986), Japanese singer
