= Unidentified submerged object =

Unusual phenomenon in water that is not readily identifiable

An unidentified submerged object (USO) is an unidentified object submerged in water. The U.S. Navy classifies USOs as whales, sharks, and other sea creatures that can interfere with ship maneuvering, sonar operations, and oceanographic research. The term has also been used by ufologists such as retired admiral Tim Gallaudet to refer to unidentified flying objects (UFOs) which can allegedly travel through water.

== See also ==
- Baltic Sea anomaly
- Sea monster
- Utsuro-bune
