= Meisei Goto =

Japanese writer

Meisei Gotō (後藤 明生, Gotō Meisei; April 4, 1932 – August 2, 1999), also known as Akio Gotō, was a Japanese author.

== Biography ==
Gotō was born in Yongheung County, Korea, Empire of Japan (now Kumya County, South Hamgyong Province, North Korea). He fled with his family to Kyūshū, Japan while in junior high school. He studied Russian literature at Waseda University, with particular interest in Nikolai Gogol. He then worked at an advertising agency and a publishing house, before becoming a professional novelist in 1968.

== Major prizes ==
- 1977 Hirabayashi Taiko Award for Yume katari (Dreams Speak)
- 1981 Tanizaki Prize for Yoshino tayū (吉野太夫, The Courtesan Yoshino)

== English translations ==
- Shot By Both Sides (Hasamiuchi, 1973), trans. Tom Gill, Japanese Literature Publishing Project, 2005 list. Published in the United States by Counterpoint, fall 2008.

== Selected works ==
- Shiteki seikatsu, 1969.
- Waraijigoku, 1969.
- Nani?, 1970.
- Kakarenai hōkoku, 1971.
- Kankei, 1971.
- En to daen no sekai, 1972.
- Gotō Meisei shū, 1972.
- Hasamiuchi (Attacked from Both Sides), 1973.
- Yonjissai no Oburōmofu, 1973.
- Fumbet suzakari no mufumbetsu, 1974.
- Fushigi na temaneki, 1975.
- Nemuri otoko no me, 1975.
- Ōinaru mujun, 1975.
- Omoigawa, 1975.
- Ugetsu monogatari kikō, 1975.
- Meguriai, 1976.
- Hasamiuchi, 1977.
- Waraizaka, 1977.
- Yukikaeri, 1977.
- Yume katari (Dreams Speak)
- Sake neko ningen, 1978.
- Torashima, 1978.
- Yonjissai no Oburōmofu (四十歲 の オブローモフ), Tōkyō : Ōbunsha, 1978.
- Yume to yume no aida, 1978.
- Hari no ana kara, 1979.
- Uso no yō na nichijō, 1979.
- Hachigatsu, 1980.
- Ugetsu Monogatari, Harusame Monogatari, 1980.
- Mieru sekai, mienai sekai, 1981.
- Warai no hōhō : aruiwa Nikorai Gōgori (笑い の 方法 : あるいは ニコライ ゴーゴリ), Tōkyō : Chūō Kōronsha, 1981.
- Yoshinotayū (吉野太夫), 1981.
- Fukushū no jidai, Tōkyō : Fukutake Shoten, 1983.
- Nanji no rinjin (汝 の 隣人), Tōkyō : Kawade Shobō Shinsha, 1983.
- Shōsetsu ikani yomi ikani kaku ka, 1983.
- Omocha no chi, chi, chi (おもちゃ の 知、 知、 知), Tōkyō : Tōjusha, 1984.
- Bungaku ga kawaru toki (文学 が 変る とき), Tōkyō : Chikuma Shobō, 1987.
- Kafuka no meikyū : Akumu no hōhō (カフカ の 迷宮 : 悪夢 の 方法 ), Tōkyō : Iwanami Shoten, 1987.
- Memento mori : Watakushi no shokudō shujutsu taiken (メメント モリ : 私 の 食道 手術 体験), Tōkyō : Chūō Kōronsha, 1990.
- Sukēpu gōto (スケープ ゴート), Tōkyō : Nihon Bungeisha, 1990.
