= Utsuro-bune =

Legendary object that washed ashore in Japan in 1803

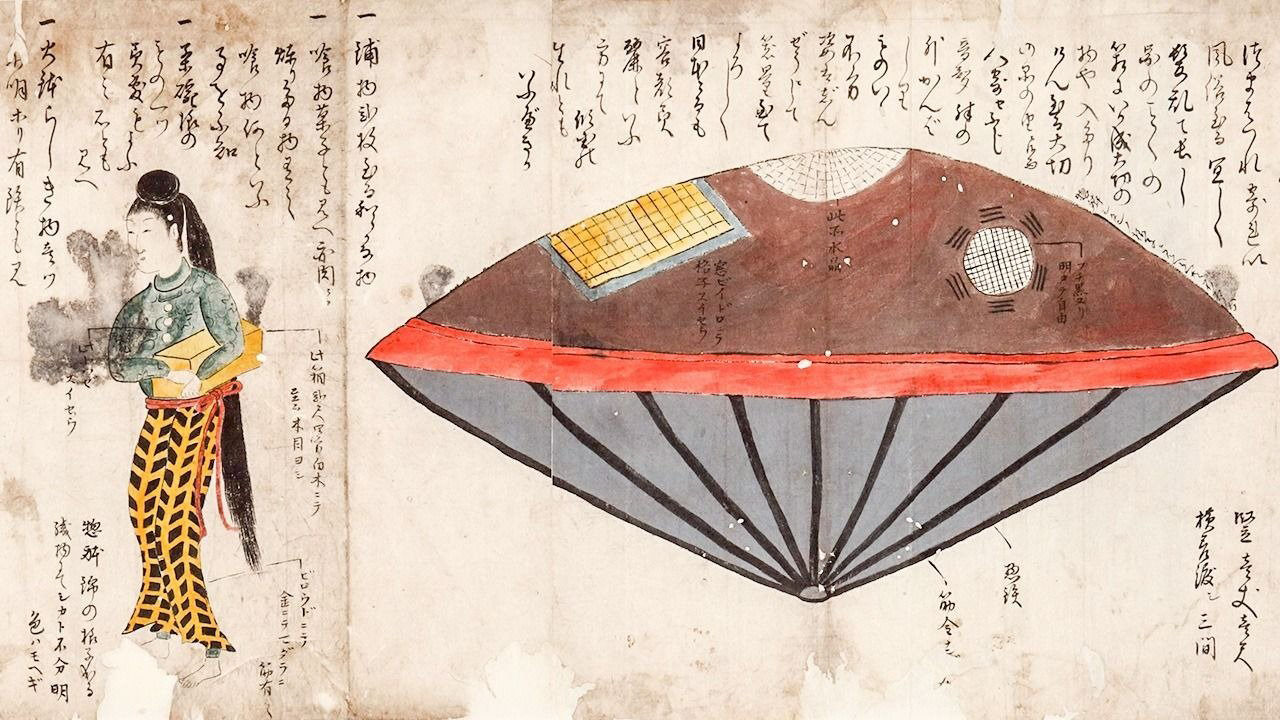
Utsuro-bune. Manjudō, the strange boat, drifted ashore on the fief of Lord Ogasawara.

Utsuro-bune (虚舟, hollow boat), also Utsuro-fune and Urobune, was an unknown object that allegedly washed ashore in 1803 in Hitachi province on the eastern coast of Japan. Utsuro means "hollow" and -bune (from fune) means "boat". Accounts of the incident appear in four texts: Oushuku Zakki (1815), Toen Shōsetsu (1825), Hyōryū Kishū (1835) and Ume-no-chiri (1844).

According to the legend, a young woman aged between 18 and 20 arrived aboard the "hollow boat" on February 22, 1803. Fishermen brought her inland, but she was unable to communicate in Japanese. The fishermen returned her and her vessel to the sea, and it drifted away.

Historians, ethnologists and physicists such as Kazuo Tanaka and Yanagita Kunio have discussed the legend as part of a longstanding tradition within Japanese folklore. Certain ufologists have claimed that the story is evidence of a close encounter with extraterrestrial life.

== Historical sources ==
The best-known versions of the legend are found in four texts:

- Oushuku Zakki (鶯宿雑記; Miscellaneous Notes from the Nightingale Inn) written by Komai Norimura around 1815.
- Toen Shōsetsu (兎園小説; Tales from the Rabbit Garden), compiled in 1825 by Kyokutei Bakin. The manuscript is today on display at the Mukyū-Kai-Toshokan in Machida (Tokyo Prefecture).
- Hyōryū Kishū (漂流紀集; Diaries and Stories of Castaways), written in 1835 by an unknown author. It is today on display at the library of Tenri University in Tenri City, Nara Prefecture.
- Ume-no-chiri (梅の塵; Dust of the Plum"), written in 1844 by Nagahashi Matajirō. It is today on display at the Iwase-Bunko-Toshokan, a private library in Nara City.

Toen Shōsetsu contains the most detailed version of the story.

== Legend ==
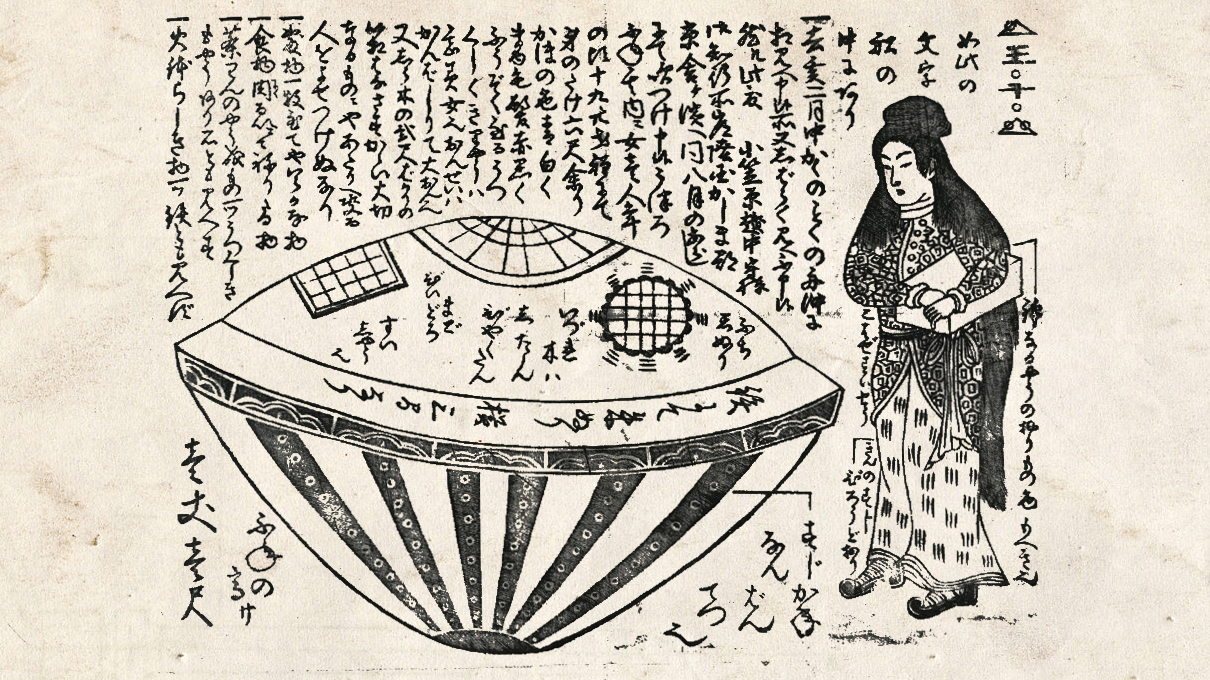
An ink drawing of the Utsuro-bune by Nagahashi Matajirou (1844).

=== Toen shōsetsu ===
On February 22, 1803, fishermen on the Harayadori (はらやどり) coast of Hitachi Province saw a strange vessel drifting in the sea. They towed the vessel to land and discovered that it was 3.30 metres (10.83 feet) high and 5.45 metres (17.88 feet) wide. Its shape reminded them of a kōro (Japanese incense burner). Its upper part appeared to be made of red-lacquered rosewood, while the lower part was covered with metal plates.

The upper part had several windows made of glass or crystal, covered with bars and clogged with some kind of tree resin. The shape of the hollow boat resembled a wooden rice pit. The windows were completely transparent and the baffled fishermen looked inside. The inner side of the utsuro-bune was decorated with texts written in an unknown language. Oddly enough, one of the symbols inside the vessel resembled South Korea's current flag. The fishermen found items inside such as two bed sheets, a bottle filled with 3.6 litres of water, some cake and kneaded meat.

Then the fishermen saw a young woman, possibly 18 or 20 years old. Her body size was said to be 1.5 metres (4.92 feet). The woman had red hair and eyebrows, the hair elongated by artificial white extensions. The extensions could have been made of white fur or thin, white-powdered textile streaks. This hairstyle cannot be found in any literature. The skin of the lady was a very pale pink color. She wore long and smooth clothes of unknown fabrics.

The woman began speaking, but no one understood her. She did not seem to understand the fishermen either, so no one could ask her about her origin. Although the mysterious woman appeared friendly and courteous, she acted oddly, for she always clutched a rectangular box made of pale material and around 0.6 m (24 in) in size. The woman did not allow anyone to touch the box, no matter how kindly or pressingly the witnesses asked.

An old man from the village theorised, that the woman could be a princess of a foreign realm, who married at her homeland. But when she had an affair with a townsman after marriage, it caused a scandal and the lover was killed for punishment. The princess was banned from home, for she enjoyed lots of sympathy, so she escaped the death penalty. Instead, she might have been exposed in that utsuro-bune to leave her to destiny. If this should be correct, the box may contain the head of the woman's deceased lover. In the past, a very similar object with a woman was washed ashore on a close-by beach.

During that incident, a small board with a pinned head was found. The content of the box could therefore be the same, which would certainly explain why she protects it so much. It would cost lots of money and time to investigate the woman and her boat. Since it seems to be tradition to expose those boats at sea, the townspeople thought they should bring the woman back to the utsuro-bune and let her drift away. The townspeople were frightened. In a different version, the lady from the hollow boat stays where she landed and grows to old age. The fishermen reassembled the utsuro-bune, placed the woman in it, and set it to drift away into the ocean. From human sight it might be cruel, but it seems to be her predetermined destiny.

=== Ume no chiri ===
On March 24, 1803, at the beach of 'Harato-no-hama' (原舎浜) in the Hitachi province, a strange 'boat' was washed ashore. It reminded the witnesses of a rice cooking pot, around its middle it had a thickened rim. It was also coated with black paint and it had four little windows on four sides. The windows had bars and they were clogged with tree resin. The lower part of the boat was protected by brazen plates which looked to be made of iron of the highest western quality. The height of the boat was 3.33 m (10.83 ft) and its breadth was 5.41 m (17.75 ft).

A woman of 20 years was found in the boat. Her body size was 1.5 m (4.92 ft) and her skin was as white as snow. The long hair dangled smoothly down along her back. The dress of the woman was of unknown style and no one could recognise it. She spoke an unknown language. She held a small box no one was allowed to touch. Inside the boat two unusually soft carpets of unknown style and fabric were found. There were supplies such as cake, kneaded food and meat. A beautifully decorated cup with ornaments no one could identify was also found.

=== Similar traditions ===
There are several further documents about utsuro-bune sightings in Japan. For example, 'Hirokata Zuihitsu' (弘賢随筆) describes an utsuro-bune docking at Toyohashi in May of the 11th year of Genroku (1698). The incident is described as follows: there "is only one woman in the boat. It seems that she was sent back to Nagasaki because she could not understand the language." and 'Ōshuku Zakki' (鶯宿雑記).The investigation started in 1844, and continued in 1925, and 1962. In 2010 and 2012, two rare ink printings were found and investigated by Kazuo Tanaka. In 1977, they contained stories about utsuro-bune with very similar content to that of the hyōryū kishū. Further, they claim a different location for the events: 'Minato Bōshū' (港房州) ('harbour of Bōshū').

=== Other legends concerning utsuro-bune ===
A well known Japanese legend is that of the origin of the Kōno clan of the Iyo Province. In the 7th century, a fisherman named 'Wakegorō' (和気五郎) from Gogo island found a 13-year-old girl inside an utsuro-bune drifting at sea. He brought her to land, where she told him that she was the daughter of the Chinese emperor and that she had been forced to flee to escape her stepmother. The fisherman named her "Wake-hime" (和気姫) ("princess Wake") and raised her, before she married an imperial prince of Iyo province and gave birth to a son named "Ochimiko" (小千御子), the ancestor of the Kōno clan. A part of this folktale held that she was responsible for bringing the first silk cocoons to Japan. Princess Wake is still worshiped at the Funakoshi Wakehime Shinto shrine in the village of Funakoshi on Gogo island.

Yet another legend that shares a lot of similarities with the story about "Wakehime" is the legend of the "Golden Princess" Konjiki-hime, of which there are several variations. But the common element is that a fisherman finds a girl set adrift in a boat, who explains that she is "a princess from India." She repays the kindness of the fisherman and his wife bestowing on them the secrets of sericulture.

== Interpretations ==
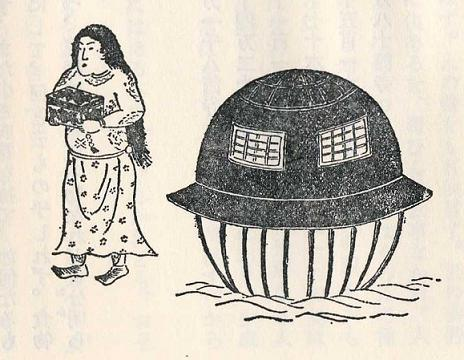
An ink drawing of the Utsuro-bune by Kyokutei Bakin (1825).

=== Historical investigations ===
The first historical investigations of the Utsuro-bune incident were conducted in 1844 by Kyokutei Bakin (1767–1848). Kyokutei reports about a book called Roshia bunkenroku (魯西亜聞見録, 'Records of seen and heard things from Russia'), written by Kanamori Kinken. The book describes traditional Russian clothes and hairstyles and mentions a popular method to dust hair with white powder. It also mentions that many Russian women have natural red hair and that they wear skirts, similar to that of the lady of the legend. The accounts in the book are most likely based on the experiences of Daikokuya Kōdayū.

This was a hair fashion that would have been common in 1782-1792 when Kodayu visited Russia, but it would have been extremely unusual and outdated by the year 1803.

Based upon the book, Kyokutei suggests that the woman of the Utsuro-bune incident could have been of Russian origin. He writes that the stories are similar to each other, as they differ only in minor descriptions (for example, one documents says "3.6 litres of water", another says "36 litres of water"). He also questions the origin of the alleged exotic symbols found in and on the boat. Because he is convinced that he saw similar signs on a British whaler stranded shortly before his writing, Kyokutei wonders if the woman was a Russian, British or even American princess. Furthermore, he expresses his disappointment about the drawings of the Utsuro-bune, because they obviously do not fully match the witness descriptions.

=== Modern investigations ===
Further investigations of the Utsuro-bune incident were done in 1925 and in 1962 by ethnologist and historian Yanagita Kunio. He points out that circular boats were not unusual in Japan (see for example Tarai-bune); only the western-like details, such as the windows made of glass and the brazen protective plates, make the Utsuro-bune look exotic. He also found out that most legends similar to that of the Utsuro-bune sound alike: someone finds a strange girl or young woman inside a circular boat and rescues the stranded or sends her back to the ocean.

Yanagita also points out that the eldest versions of Utsuro-bune describe humble, circular and open log-boats without any dome atop. Yanagita assumes that the details of the brazen plates and windows made of glass or crystal were added because skeptics would question the seaworthiness of a humble log-boat on the high seas. A steel-reinforced Utsuro-bune with glass windows would more easily survive travel on the ocean than an open, unreinforced wooden boat would.

Dr. Kazuo Tanaka (田中 嘉津夫), Japanese professor for computer and electronics engineering from University of Electro-Communications at Tokyo (東京), investigated the original scripts in 1997. He considers the popular comparisons of the Utsuro-bune with modern UFO sightings to be far-fetched. He points out that the Utsuro-bune of the legends never flies or moves on its own, nor does it show any signs of extraordinary technologies. It simply drifts motionless on the water. Tanaka concludes that the tale of the Utsuro-bune was a literary mixture of folklore and imaginations. He bases his assumptions on the 1925 investigations of Yanagita Kunio.

The peculiar European appearance of the woman, the upper part of the Utsuro-bune and the unknown writings lead Tanaka and Yanagita to the conclusion that the whole story was based on the historical circumstance that people of the Edo period totally encapsulated Japan against the outer world. To bedizen a stranded woman with European attributes showed how much the peoples were afraid of bad cultural influences from the western world, especially North America and Great Britain. The story of the Utsuro-bune is significantly constructed in a way that makes the tale sound incredible at one site, but self-explaining at the same time (the woman and her craft are sent away so no one could ever consult her personally).

Furthermore, Tanaka and Yanagita point out that the people of Edo period shared great interests in paranormal things such as yūrei, onibi, hitodama and yōkai, so it would not be surprising to find stories of exotic boats like the Utsuro-bune.

Tanaka also points out that the word Utsuro means "empty" or "abandoned" and that the word Utsubo means "quiver" and describes the bags in which hunters and archers once carried their arrows. But both words also describe old, hollowed tree trunks and branch holes of sacred trees. The word Fune/Bune simply means "boat". Altogether, the term Utsuro-bune means "hollow ship". In modern Japanese parlance the term means "cargo".

Regarding the characters said to have been written on the Utsuro-bune, the author Hideki Satō observed that they were similar to alchemical symbols. In particular, the third character, "🜣", perfectly matches the symbol for "copper saffron," and he explains that the other characters also correspond to known symbols, such as "🜂" (representing "fire") and "🝨" (representing "immersion"), albeit with some additional elements. Notably, alchemical symbols were also used in Edo-period Japan, as seen in the Rangakusha Shibai Mitate Banzuke ("Cast List of Rangaku Scholars as Kabuki Actors") included in Geikai Yoha Daiisshū, where they appear as crests representing Rangakusha. (see Japanese Wikipedia)

==== Location ====
Dr. Tanaka himself found out that the locations "Haratono-hama" and "Harayadori" are fictitious. He assumes, that in order to make the anecdote sound credible, the author designated the beaches as personal acreages of a Daimyō named Ogasawara Nagashige. This daimyō actually lived during the Edo period, but his acreages were placed at heartland and it seems sure that Ogasawara never had any contact with the fishermen of the Pacific coast. The Ogasawara clan served the famous Tokugawa clan, who held power over the most north-eastern part of Japan until 1868 and their main acreages were placed in the Hitachi province, geographically very close to the eastern beaches.

Tanaka finds it very odd that no incident of such alleged importance was commented on in the curatorial documents, since strangers leaving the shore had to be reported at once. But the only remarkable incident during the late Tokugawa clan happened in 1824, when a British whaler was stranded at the north-eastern coast of the Hitachi district. Tanaka also found out that, during the rulership of the Tokugawa clan, the Ogasawara family and the Tokugawa started mapping their territories and acreages. And both names of "Haratono-hama" and "Harayadori" are missing. They also do not appear on the maps of the first complete mappings of the whole of Japan in 1907. If the name of a village, city or place had changed in history, this would have been noted in some curatorial documents, but it is not. Tanaka thinks it rather unlikely that important places such as "Haratono-hama" and "Harayadori" actually could have been forgotten in records.

In his conclusions, Tanaka points to the difficulty in the correct reading of the place names. In modern transcriptions, the Kanji 原舎 have to be read as Harasha. But in Toen Shōsetsu the signs are written in Kana and they have to be read as Hara-yadori. In Ume no chiri they are written in Furigana making the place to be named as Haratono-hama. Alternatively, the kanji for Haratono could be read as Hara-yadori. According to Tanaka's investigations, the transcription of 原舎ヶ浜 in the Hyōryū Kishū as "Harasha-ga-hama" is therefore a typo based on a misreading and should originally be read as "Haratono-ga-hama". Thus, all writings describe the same place.

On May 26, 2014, The Ibaragi Shimbun (茨城新聞, Ibaragi Shinbun) reported that Tanaka found Jinichi Kawakami's palaeography (ja:古文書, Komonjo) regarding the Utsuro-bune strange story (うつろ舟奇談, Uturobune kidan) where the place name is given as Hitachihara Sharihama (常陸原舎り濱). This corresponds to today's Sharihama beach in Hasaki, Kamisu city (神栖市波崎舎利浜) and is mentioned in a coast survey in 1801 and in Dai Nihon Enkai Yochi Zenzu (ja:大日本沿海輿地全図 maps of Japan's coastal area) by Inō Tadataka.

=== Ufological ===
In ufology, the legend of the Utsuro-bune has been described as an early case of a documented close encounter of the third kind based on the similarities between the drawings of the vessel from the Edo period and 20th-century descriptions of flying saucers. Some ufologists suggest the Utsuro-bune could have been an unidentified submerged object (USO). They note the mysterious symbols which were reportedly found on the object that regularly appear as addenda within the depictions.

They are suggested by some to be similar to the symbols reported from the Rendlesham Forest Incident in England. Drawings of odd figures and unknown symbols have also been found in caves. UFO proponents further point to the woman's box, her physical appearance and unusual dress as evidence of off world human visitation.

Japanese folklore and culture

The box that the woman according to the accounts carried and refused to let anyone else handle or open shares some similarities with the gehobako box carried by wandering miko and itako. These boxes would usually contain magic objects but it’s also believed that in pre-modern times these boxes contained human skulls. This would tie in with one of the eyewitness accounts speculating on the contents of the box that it could "contain the head of the woman’s deceased lover" as they processed the mystery of the woman through their own Japanese cultural lens.

Further similarities may be noted as the box resembles the notion of the tamatebako box recorded in the folk-narrative of Urashima Tarō. In the legend, the box is issued to Urashima by the deity Otohime and opening it caused the bearer thereof to age rapidly.

Red hair

In Japanese culture red hair was connected to demons [Japanese: yokai], such as the oni Shuten-dōji, the akagami, the illusion of a young and beautiful red-haired woman who lures humans to their deaths, and the shojo, female youkai who have long red hair and live near the ocean.

To the Japanese people European foreigners, were known as red-haired barbarians. The woman's hair being described as red therefore further signifies her "otherness".

In 1803, when this incident is said to have taken place, the Dutch were the only European foreigners allowed to enter Japan (in a limited capacity), which meant that Dutch men were allowed to exist on Dejima island, a man-made island which wasn't legally classed as part of Japan for trading purposes with the Dutch. Tanaka nevertheless speculates that the Utsuro-bune might have been a shipwreck of a European vessel and the mysterious woman was a passenger. and that it became tied in with earlier Utsuro-bune legends.

In Hokota city, Ibaraki prefecture a playground was built based on the illustration of the Utsuro-bune.

=== Exhibitions ===
In 2017, Mori Art Museum held an exhibition called “The Universe and Art” where visitor could view an Utsuro-bune historical document. (Manjudō, the strange boat drifted ashore on fief of Lord Ogasawara.) The venue also had Swiss manufacturer Sigg to create gift items for them, one of the items being a donburi rice bowl in the shape of the Utsuro-Bune and when you remove the lid you find the figure of the mysterious woman inside.

In 2023, an exhibition about the Utsuro-bune called “Fushigi Yuugi Utsuro-bune” (Mysterious world of the Utsuro-bune) was showcased in Mito, Ibaraki Prefecture at the Joyo City History and Folklore Museum. Visitors were able to view historical documents as well as depictions of the Utsuro-bune created by ceramic artists.
