= Leon Zolbrod =

Leon M. Zolbrod (1930 – 16 April 1991) was a scholar and translator of Japanese literature and history.

His interest in studying the literature of Japan developed from his duties as a member of the U.S. Army of occupation in 1948. He earned his Ph.D. from Columbia University (as a graduate student he studied at the Department of Chinese Literature at Tokyo University) before becoming visiting professor of Japanese history and literature at University of British Columbia's Department of Asian Studies in 1967, joining the faculty the following year.

== Works ==
Zolbrod wrote numerous articles and books on the subject of Japanese literature and history. His books included:

- Leon Zolbrod (1983). Haiku Painting. Kodansha America. ISBN 0-87011-560-X.
- Leon Zolbrod (1967). Takizawa Bakin. Twain Publishers. ASIN B0006BQCWI.
- Akinari Ueda Trans. Leon Zolbrod (1988) [1974]. Ugetsu Monogatari: Tales of Moonlight and Rain. Tuttle. ISBN 0-8048-1549-6.
