= Yodotaki =

Japanese sideshow performer (born 1784)

Yodotaki (Japanese: 淀滝; born 1784) was an Edo period Japanese sideshow performer, described in secondary sources as a remarkably tall and powerful strongwoman performer in Edo (modern Tokyo). Sources give her height at seven shaku five sun (227.3 cm (7 ft 5.5 in)). Multiple Edo-period primary sources mention her, including Takizawa Bakin (1767–1848), the author of Nansō Satomi Hakkenden, who mentions her in his miscellany Toen Shōsetsu (1825). Other primary sources, Waga Koromo, Kiku no Manimani, Gaidan Bunbun Shūyō (1860), and Bukō Nenpyō also mention her.

== Biography and performances ==
Yodotaki performed at a sideshow booth (Misemono) or a tea house around Yanagi Inari in the Asakusa entertainment area. The Edo period essay collection Waga Koromo describes her as mime-yoshi (見目よし; "good-looking"). Her act featured feats of strength. In her performances, she would grip a go-board and swing it to blow out candles. She also carried a 60 kg (130 lb) rice bale with a small man sitting on top. She lifted as much as 206 kg (454 lb), or held a temple bell on her left shoulder while writing with her right hand.

== Height and Raiden Tameemon ==
Sources describe her at seven shaku five sun (227.3 cm) as taller than the sumo wrestler Raiden Tameemon (1767–1825), who stood at six shaku five sun (197 cm). Yodotaki and Raiden lived during the same period. While Raiden's activity was centered in the Ryōgoku area, Yodotaki performed in nearby Asakusa, located within walking distance of Ryōgoku.
