= Mainichi Film Award for Best Sound Recording =

Annual Japanese film award

- Awarded for: Best sound recording of the year
- Country: Japan
- First award: 1947

The Mainichi Film Award for Best Sound Recording is a film award given at the Mainichi Film Awards.

== Award winners ==
Year	Film	Recording Technician
1947	Joyū	Shigeharu Yasue
1948	Waga Shōgai no Kagayakeru Hi	Saburō Ōmura
1949	Good Bye	Masakazu Kamiya
1950	Escape at Dawn; Portrait of Madame Yuki	Masakazu Kamiya
1951	Repast	Masao Fujiyoshi
1952	Ikiru	Fumio Yanoguchi
1953	Ugetsu	Iwao Ōtani
1954	Kono Hiroi Sora no Dokokani; The Garden of Women; Twenty-Four Eyes	Hisao Ōno
1955	Floating Clouds	Hisashi Shimonaga
1956	Shin Heike Monogatari; Shin Heike Monogatari Yoshinaka o Meguru Sannin no Onna; Zangiku monogatari Yoru no Kawa	Yukio Kaihara
1957	The Rice People; Jun'ai Monogatari	Hirokazu Iwata
1958	Equinox Flower	Saburō Senoyoshi
1959	Saijo Kishitsu; My Second Brother	Fumio Hashimoto
1960	Yakuza Sensei; Ashita Hareruka	Masakazu Kamiya
1961	Shaka	Masao Ōsumi
1962	Harakiri	Hideo Nishizaki
1963	Onna no Rekishi	Masao Fujiyoshi
1964	Unholy Desire	Koshirō Jinbo
1965	Tokyo Olympiad	Toshihiko Inoue and recording staffs
1966	Akogare	Masao Fujiyoshi
1967	Portrait of Chieko; Sekishun	Toshio Tanaka
1968	The Sands of Kurobe	Tetsuo Yasuda; Kenichi Benitani
1969	The Love Suicides at Amijima	Hideo Nishizaki
1970	Men and War: Part I	Tsuneo Furuyama
1971	Inn of Evil; Silence; The Ceremony	Hideo Nishizaki
1972	The Long Darkness; Ongaku	Mutsutoshi Ōta
1973	Tsugaru Jongara Bushi	Takaya Sugiura
1974	Himiko	Hideo Nishizaki
1975	Matsuri no Junbi; Dokkoi! Ningenbushi	Yukio Kubota
1976	The Inugami Family	Tetsuya Ōhashi
1977	The Yellow Handkerchief	Hiroshi Nakamura
1978	Third Base	Yukio Kubota
1979	Vengeance Is Mine	Shōtarō Yoshida
1980	Virus	Kenichi Benitani
1981	The Love Suicides at Sonezaki; Eijanaika	Shōtarō Yoshida
1982	The Go Masters	Fumio Hashimoto; Lü Qingchang (呂慶昌)
1983	The Ballad of Narayama	Kenichi Benitani
1984	Shanghai Rhapsody	Kazuhisa Takahashi
1985	Sorekara; Love Letter; Early Spring Story; Tampopo	Fumio Hashimoto
1986	Uemura Naomi Monogatari	Fumio Hashimoto
1987	The Emperor's Naked Army Marches On	Toyohiko Kuribayashi
1988	Bokura no Nanokakan Sensō	Ichirō Tsujii
1989	Beijing Watermelon	Masatoshi Yokomizo; Shōhei Hayashi
1990	The Sting of Death; Childhood Days	Hideo Nishizaki
1991	A Scene at the Sea	Senji Horiuchi
1992	Original Sin	Tsutomu Honda
1993	Bloom in the Moonlight	Yoshio Horiike; Manabu Kakuhata
1993	Byōin de Shinu to Iukoto	Yasuo Hashimoto
1994	Like a Rolling Stone; Tokarefu	Kiyoshi Kakizawa
1995	Sharaku; Kinkyū Yobidashi Emergency Call	Tetsuo Segawa
1996	Nemuru Otoko	Sōichi Inoue
1996	A Class to Remember 2	Isao Suzuki
1997	Mi mo Kokoro mo	Kōichi Hayashi
1998	Give It All	Hiromichi Kōri
1999	Osaka Story; Gamera 3: The Revenge of Iris	Yasuo Hashimoto
2000	Face	Fumio Hashimoto
2001	Onmyoji	Osamu Onodera; Kiyoshi Kakizawa
2002	The Twilight Samurai	Kazumi Kishida
2003	Hotel Hibiscus; Get Up!	Mitsugu Shiratori
2004	Nobody Knows	Yutaka Tsurumaki
2005	Itsuka dokusho suruhi	Masatoshi Yokomizo
2006	Hula Girls; Sway	Mitsugu Shiratori
2006	What the Snow Brings	Osamu Onodera
2007	Talk Talk Talk	Masato Komatsu
2008	Departures	Satoshi Ozaki
2009	Mt. Tsurugidake	Kenichi Ishidera
2010	13 Assassins	Jun Nakamura
2011	Postcard	Satoshi Ozaki
2012	Kita no Kanaria Tachi	Junichi Shima
2013	The Story of Yonosuke	Masato Yano
2014	The Eternal Zero	Ken'ichi Fujimoto
2015	Three Stories of Love	Takeshi Ogawa
2016	Satoshi: A Move for Tomorrow	Mitsugu Shiratori
2017	The Tokyo Night Sky Is Always the Densest Shade of Blue	Hirokazu Katō and Kengo Takasuka
2018	Every Day A Good Day	Noriyoshi Yoshida
2019	Another World	Ken'ichi Fujimoto
2020	Underdog	Kazunori Fujimoto
2021	Last of the Wolves	Tomoharu Urata
2022	Small, Slow But Steady	Takamitsu Kawai
2023	Okiku and the World	Jun'ichi Shima
2024	11 Rebels	Tomoharu Urata
2025	Kokuho	Mitsugu Shiratori
