= Toen Shōsetsu =

1825 collection of Japanese tales

- Author: Kyokutei Bakin (as Takizawa Toku)
- Language: Japanese
- Publisher: Nihon Zuihitsu Taisei Kankōkai (1928 edition)
- Publication date: 1825
- Publication place: Japan
- Media type: Print

Toen Shōsetsu (兎園小説, "Tales from the Rabbit Garden") is a collection of unusual tales, rumors, and scholarly discussions compiled by Kyokutei Bakin (1767–1848) under his given name Takizawa Toku. The work was completed in 1825 and comprises twelve volumes. It records the proceedings of the Toenkai (兎園会), a literary circle whose members gathered monthly to share and discuss strange and curious stories. The work has been reprinted in several anthologies, including Hyakka Setsurin (百家説林, 1891–1892), Zuihitsu Sanjushu (随筆三十種, 1897), and Nihon Zuihitsu Taisei (日本随筆大成), all of which are available through the National Diet Library Digital Collections.

== Supplementary volumes ==
After the Toenkai disbanded, Bakin continued collecting unusual tales. In addition to the main twelve-volume work, Toen Shōsetsu includes supplementary volumes: the Gaishū (外集), Besshu (別集), Shūi (拾遺), and Yoroku (余録), totalling nine additional volumes, all included in Nihon Zuihitsu Taisei.

== Notable entries ==
Toen Shōsetsu contains one of the most detailed accounts of the Utsuro-bune legend, describing a round vessel that drifted ashore in Hitachi Province in 1803, carrying a young foreign woman with red hair who clutched an unknown box and could not communicate with the locals. The Besshu contains an account of a dispute between Bakin and Yamazaki Yoshinari (山崎美成) over soba-eating customs and dining culture, now considered a valuable source for the study of Edo-period food history. The Yoroku includes an account of the Eitai Bridge collapse of 1807, in which the bridge fell under the weight of a large crowd, and a passage describing individuals who might today be understood as having a gender identity differing from their birth sex. One entry in the main collection describes Tsuta (Yodotaki), a giant woman from Shinagawa.

== Published editions ==
Nihon Zuihitsu Taisei Henshūbu, ed. "Toen Shōsetsu." Nihon Zuihitsu Taisei, 2nd series, vol. 1. Nihon Zuihitsu Taisei Kankōkai, 1928, pp. 1–346. Nihon Zuihitsu Taisei Henshūbu, ed. "Toen Shōsetsu Gaishū." Nihon Zuihitsu Taisei, 2nd series, vol. 2. Nihon Zuihitsu Taisei Kankōkai, 1928, pp. 367–427. Nihon Zuihitsu Taisei Henshūbu, ed. "Toen Shōsetsu Besshu." Nihon Zuihitsu Taisei, 2nd series, vol. 2. Nihon Zuihitsu Taisei Kankōkai, 1928, pp. 429–547. Nihon Zuihitsu Taisei Henshūbu, ed. "Toen Shōsetsu Yoroku." Nihon Zuihitsu Taisei, 2nd series, vol. 3. Nihon Zuihitsu Taisei Kankōkai, 1928, pp. 1–69. Nihon Zuihitsu Taisei Henshūbu, ed. "Toen Shōsetsu Shūi." Nihon Zuihitsu Taisei, 2nd series, vol. 3. Nihon Zuihitsu Taisei Kankōkai, 1928, pp. 71–154. "Toenkai Shūsetsu." Kinko Bungei Onchi Sōsho, vol. 11, annotated by Naitō Chisō and Komiyama Yasusuke. Hakubunkan, 1911.
