= Ugetsu =

1953 film

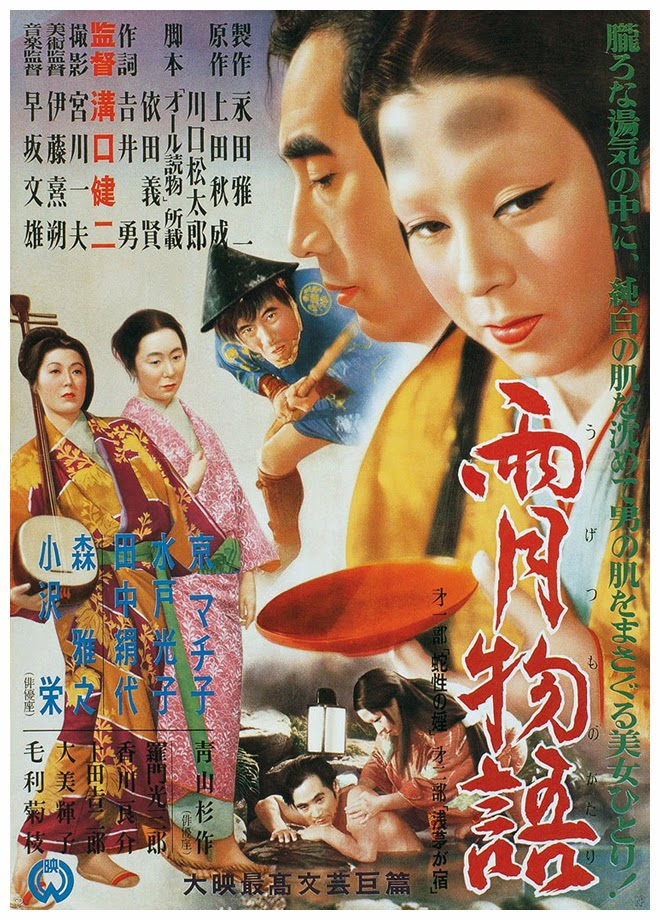
- Theatrical release poster
- Directed by: Kenji Mizoguchi
- Screenplay by: Matsutarō Kawaguchi; Yoshikata Yoda
- Based on: Ugetsu Monogatari by Ueda Akinari
- Produced by: Masaichi Nagata
- Starring: Machiko Kyō; Mitsuko Mito; Kinuyo Tanaka; Masayuki Mori; Sakae Ozawa
- Cinematography: Kazuo Miyagawa
- Edited by: Mitsuzō Miyata
- Music by: Fumio Hayasaka
- Production company: Daiei Film
- Distributed by: Daiei Film
- Release date: 26 March 1953 (Japan)
- Running time: 96 minutes
- Country: Japan
- Language: Japanese

Ugetsu (雨月物語, Ugetsu Monogatari, lit. "Rain-moon tales") is a 1953 Japanese period fantasy film directed by Kenji Mizoguchi starring Masayuki Mori and Machiko Kyō. It was written by Matsutarō Kawaguchi and Yoshikata Yoda based on the stories "The House in the Thicket" and "The Lust of the White Serpent" from Ueda Akinari's 1776 book Ugetsu Monogatari, combining elements of the jidaigeki (period drama) genre with a ghost story.

Drawing from Ueda's tales, the film is set in Japan's civil war–torn Azuchi–Momoyama period (1568–1600). In a small rural community, a potter leaves his wife and young son behind to make money selling pottery and ends up being seduced by a spirit that makes him forget all about his family. A subplot, inspired by Guy de Maupassant's 1883 short story "How He Got the Legion of Honor" ("Décoré!"), involves his brother-in-law, who dreams of becoming a samurai and chases this goal at the unintended expense of his wife.

The film won the Silver Lion Award at the 1953 Venice Film Festival and other honours. Ugetsu is one of Mizoguchi's most celebrated films, regarded by critics as a masterpiece of Japanese cinema and one of the greatest films of all time, credited with simultaneously helping to popularize Japanese cinema in the West and influencing later Japanese film.

== Plot ==
Genjūrō, a farmer from the village of Nakanogō on the shore of Lake Biwa in Ōmi Province during the Sengoku period, makes pottery and sells it in town alongside his brother-in-law, Tōbei, who dreams of becoming a samurai. When Shibata Katsuie's army sweeps through the village and forces the villagers to flee, Genjūrō persists in working to finish his pottery, intending on making a profit in nearby Ōmizo.

As Genjūrō, Tōbei and their wives travel toward Ōmizo across Lake Biwa, they encounter a boat carrying a dying man, who warns them of pirates. Miyagi, Genjūrō's wife, is returned to the shore with their young son, Genichi, while Tōbei's wife, Ohama, decides to accompany the men. In Ōmizo, Genjūrō's pottery sells well. After taking his share of the profits, Tōbei purchases samurai armor and sneaks into an army camp. Becoming lost while searching for him, Ohama is captured by a group of soldiers and raped.

Location of Ōmi Province, the setting of Ugetsu.

A noblewoman, Lady Wakasa, and her female servant visit Genjūrō, ordering several pieces of pottery and requesting that he deliver them to her mansion. There, he learns that the women are the only survivors of the Kutsuki clan following a massacre by Oda Nobunaga's army, and that Wakasa's father haunts the mansion. Wakasa seduces Genjūrō and convinces him to marry her. Meanwhile back in Nakanogō, soldiers desperately searching for food accost Miyagi and stab her. She collapses with her son still clutching her back.

Tōbei steals the head of a defeated general and presents it to the commander of the victors, earning himself a retinue. Later, he rides into town on his new horse, eager to return home to show his wife. Stopping by a brothel, he finds her working there as a prostitute. Tōbei begs for her forgiveness and promises to redeem her honor.

Genjūrō meets a priest who tells him to return to his loved ones or accept death. When Genjūrō mentions Wakasa, the priest reveals that she is dead and performs a ritual with Genjūrō, painting Sanskrit symbols on his body. Returning to the mansion, Genjūrō admits that he is married, has a child, and wishes to go home. Wakasa and her servant concede that they are spirits, returned to this world so Wakasa, who was slain before experiencing love, could fulfill that desire. Wakasa attempts to stop him from leaving but cannot touch him due to the presence of the symbols. Genjūrō reaches for a sword, throws himself out of the manor, and collapses.

Genjūrō wakes up the next day and finds himself in the middle of a ruin. He is accused of stealing the sword by soldiers, which he denies, insisting it is from the Kutsuki mansion. The soldiers inform him that the mansion had long been destroyed, confiscate his money, but spare him imprisonment as the prison has burned down. Genjūrō returns home and is reunited with an overjoyed Miyagi, to whom he admits that he has made a terrible mistake. He holds Genichi in his arms and falls asleep. The next morning, Genjūrō is awakened by the village chief. The chief, surprised to see him home, explains that he has been caring for Genichi after Miyagi was stabbed to death.

Later, Tōbei returns to Nakanogō with Ohama. He reflects on his mistakes and resolves to work hard from then on. Genjūrō continues caring for Genichi and working on his pottery. Ohama gives Genichi a plate of food, which he takes and places on his mother's grave.

== Cast ==
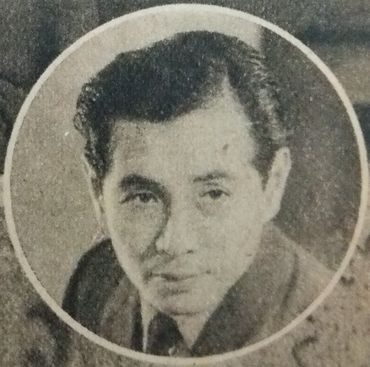
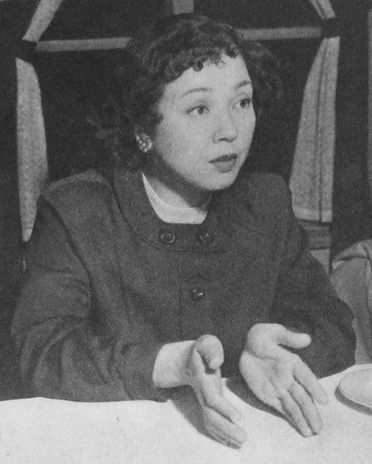
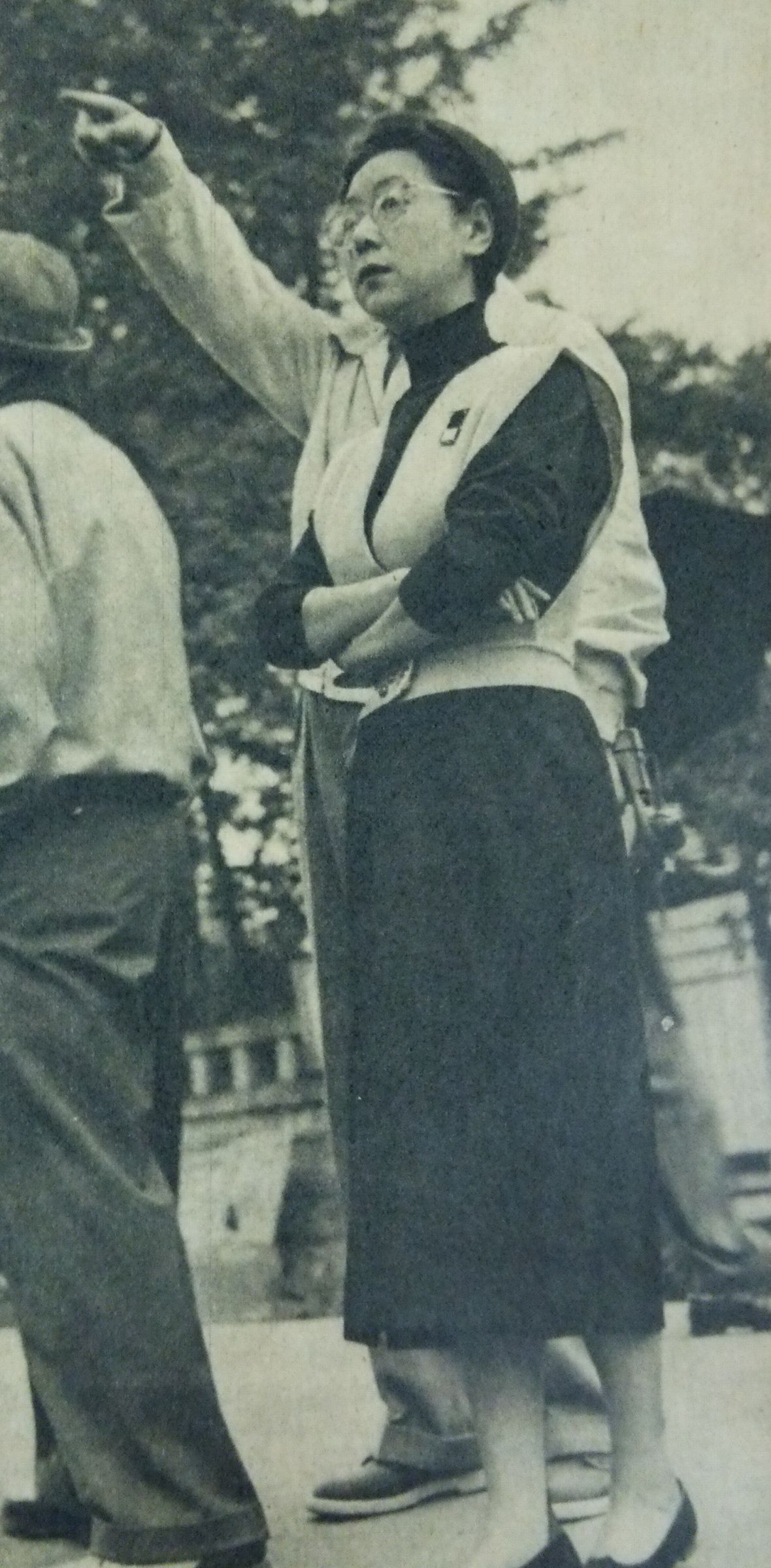
Masayuki Mori, Machiko Kyō and Kinuyo Tanaka star in the film.
- Machiko Kyō as Lady Wakasa
- Mitsuko Mito as Ohama
- Kinuyo Tanaka as Miyagi
- Masayuki Mori as Genjūrō
- Eitaro Ozawa as Tōbei (credited as Sakae Ozawa)
- Ichisaburo Sawamura as Genichi
- Kikue Mōri as Ukon, Lady Wakasa's nurse
- Ryōsuke Kagawa as village master
- Eigoro Onoe as knight
- Saburo Date as vassal
- Sugisaku Aoyama as old priest
- Reiko Kongo as old woman in brothel
- Shozo Nanbu as Shinto priest
- Ichirō Amano as boatsman
- Kichijirō Ueda as shop owner
- Teruko Omi as prostitute
- Keiko Koyanagi as prostitute
- Mitsusaburō Ramon as Captain of Tamba soldiers
- Jun Fujikawa as lost soldier
- Ryuuji Fukui as lost soldier
- Masayoshi Kikuno as soldier
- Hajime Koshikawa
- Sugisaka Koyama as High Priest
- Ryuzaburo Mitsuoka as soldier
- Koji Murata
- Fumihiko Yokoyama

== Production ==
=== Development ===
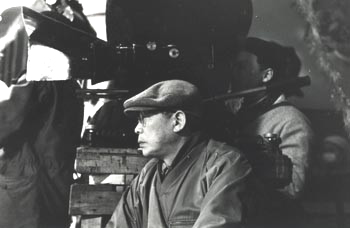
Director Kenji Mizoguchi made the effects of war a major theme of his film.

After the success of his previous film The Life of Oharu (1952), Mizoguchi was offered to make a film by his old friend Masaichi Nagata at Daiei Film studios. The deal promised Mizoguchi complete artistic control and a large budget. Despite this, Mizoguchi was eventually pressured to make a less pessimistic ending for the film. Mizoguchi's screenwriter and long-time collaborator Yoshikata Yoda said that originally, Mizoguchi did not envision making an anti-war film, instead wishing to capture the sensations and lucidity of Ueda's book Ugetsu Monogatari.

Mizoguchi based his film on two stories from Ueda's book, "The House in the Thicket" (Asaji ga Yado) and "The Lust of the White Serpent" (Jasei no In). "The Lust of the White Serpent" is about a demon who appears as a princess and attempts to seduce a man. It was the basis of the plot in which Lady Wakasa seduces Genjūrō. "The House in the Thicket" gave the film its ending, in which the protagonist returns home after a long absence, only to meet the spirit of his lost wife. The film is set in the 16th century, though "The House in the Thicket" is set in the 15th century and "The Lust of the White Serpent" is set in an earlier time frame. Other inspirations for the film's script include Guy de Maupassant's Décoré! (How He Got the Legion of Honour). This story provided a basis for Tōbei's subplot. In the short story, the protagonist receives the French Legion of Honour by ignoring his wife's adultery with a member of the Legion. Similarly, Tōbei becomes a samurai while his wife becomes a prostitute.

Despite initial intentions, as the film developed, Yoda said anti-war messages, particularly about how war makes women suffer, kept surfacing and soon became the most prominent theme. While writing the script, Mizoguchi told Yoda "Whether war originates in the ruler's personal motives, or in some public concern, how violence, disguised as war, oppresses and torments the populace both physically and spiritually ... I want to emphasise this as the main theme of the film". During the shooting Yoda was constantly rewriting and revising scenes due to Mizoguchi's perfectionism.

=== Casting ===
The film was Machiko Kyō's second collaboration with Mizoguchi, as she had a small role in The Three Danjuros (1944). She had collaborated much more frequently with Masayuki Mori. As Lady Wakasa, Kyō's costume was modeled after fashion before the Edo period and her face was designed to appear similar to a mask common in Noh theatre. As such, her eyebrows were styled using a practice known as hikimayu.

Kinuyo Tanaka, who played Miyagi, found the scene where she is a ghost to be the most stressful, as she had to play a ghost and appear to be an actual wife at the same time. After rehearsals and the shooting, Mizoguchi lit a cigarette for Mori, indicating his rare degree of satisfaction with the scene. Eitaro Ozawa, who played Tōbei, said the actors frequently rehearsed alone, or with the cinematographer, while Mizoguchi was willingly absent during these preparations.

=== Filming ===
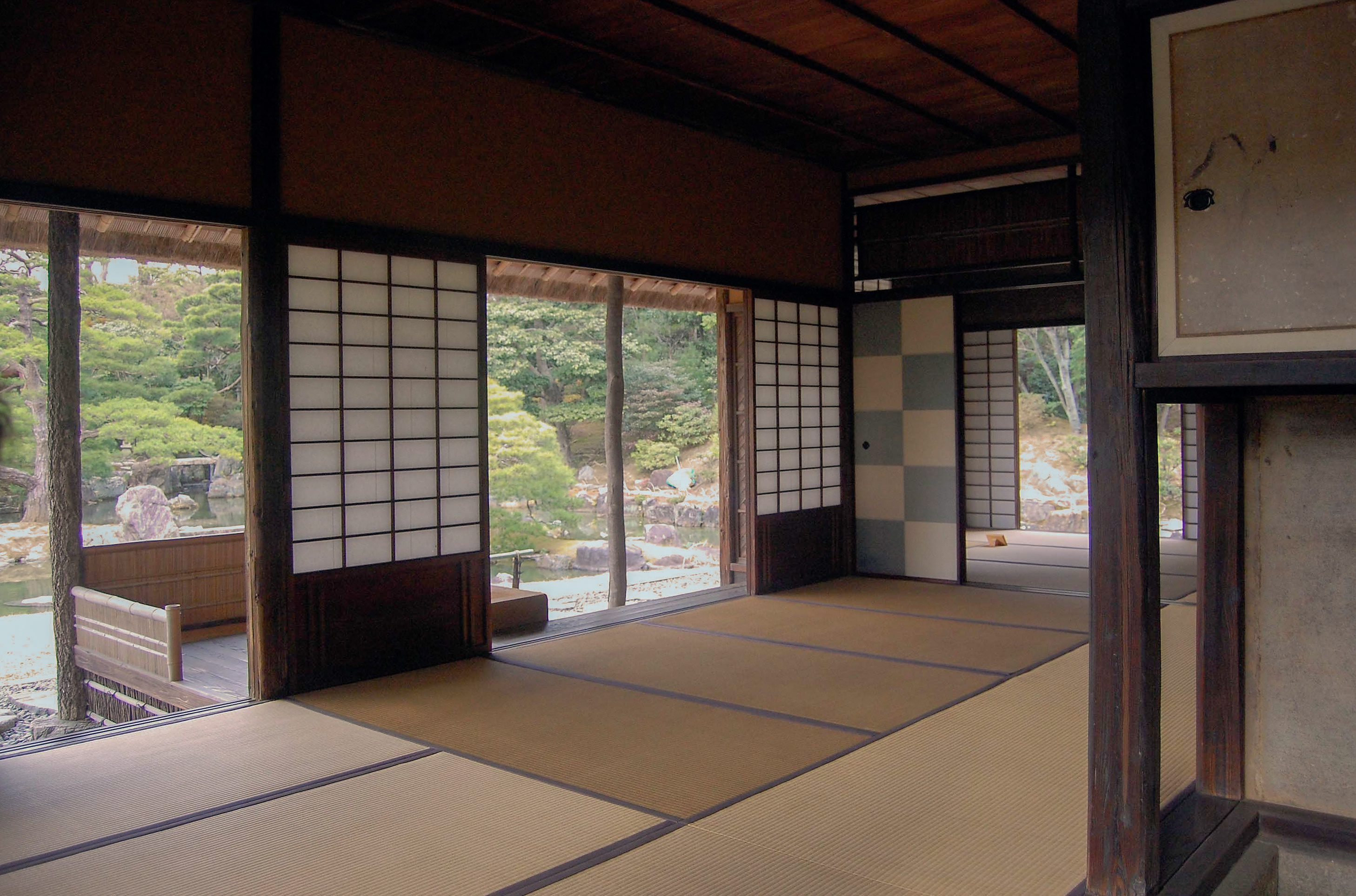
Katsura Imperial Villa was the basis for Katsuki Manor.

Mizoguchi told his cinematographer Kazuo Miyagawa that he wanted the film "to unroll seamlessly like a scroll-painting". The Southern School of Chinese painting was particularly an inspiration the filmmakers aspired to. The film has been praised for its cinematography, such as the opening shot and the scene where Genjūrō and Lady Wakasa have sex by a stream and the camera follows the flow of the water instead of lingering on the two lovers. Mizoguchi never personally handled the camera and did not participate in planning the lighting of his film. To achieve the appearance the filmmakers wanted, Miyagawa kept lighting low and filmed as near to sunset as circumstances would allow. Many of the shots were taken from cranes, with Miyagawa claiming in 1992 that these shots made up 70% of the film.

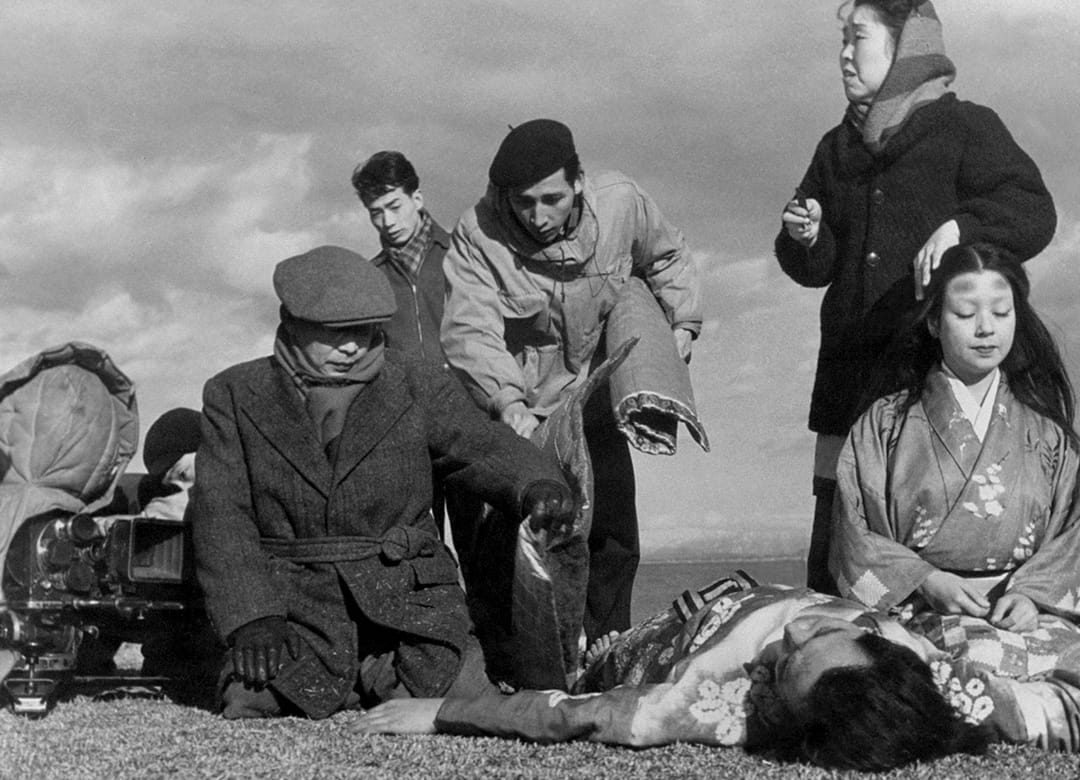
Shooting of Ugetsu

Miyagawa also stated that this film was the only occasion in which Mizoguchi complimented him for his camera work.

The set depicting Kutsuki Manor was based on the Katsura Imperial Villa in Kyoto. These sets are decorated with props evocative of feudal-era aristocrats, such as kimono and armor, personally chosen by Mizoguchi. The scene where the protagonists travel through Lake Biwa on a boat was in fact shot on a pool in the studio, with added smoke. The assistant directors had to push the boat through the cold waters. Miyagawa identified this as one of the scenes shot from a crane.

=== Music ===
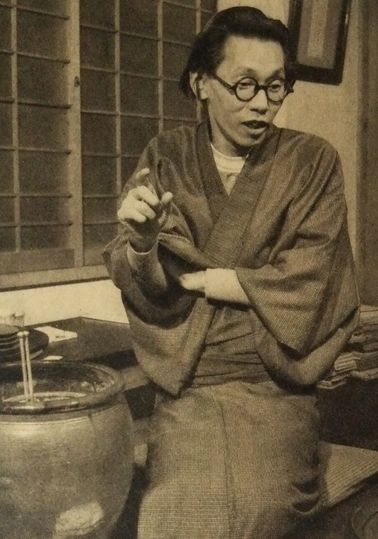
Fumio Hayasaka composed the score.

For the film score, Mizoguchi relied on composer Fumio Hayasaka and the assistant directors, and was not involved in their creative process. Fumio Hayasaka was a strong proponent of using Japanese music in Japanese films, though he incorporated several elements of Western music as well. For Ugetsu, he employed geza music, common in Kabuki theatre. Additional, uncredited composers were Ichirō Saitō and Tamekichi Mochizuki, whose music was blended with Hayasaka's, and could provide accurate music reflective of the period.

The score employs drums, flutes and chanting. The film's sounds also include bells heard in improbable places. There is significant use of the harp, restricted to the presence of the supernatural.

== Themes ==
According to Professor Martha P. Nochimson, a common interpretation of the film is that Mizoguchi refashioned the stories of Ugetsu Monogatari to express regret about the pro-war extremism leading to World War II, with Mizoguchi personally having made the pro-war propaganda film The 47 Ronin in 1941. These reflections on militarism, greed and arrogance connected with audiences not only in Japan but around the world in the wake of the war. The subplot of Tōbei and Ohama particularly reflects the comfort women, who were made into prostitutes by the Imperial Japanese Army. Mizoguchi struggled with Daiei to give the subplot an unhappier ending than what appears in the film, in line with real comfort women's experiences after the war. Tōbei's subplot reveals the mistake of war can also be a "tragicomedy".

According to British critic Tony Rayns the film's presentation of the vanity of a man, neglecting his family, is a critique of historic men in feudal Japanese culture. In his relationship with Wakasa, Genjūrō is insignificant and is seduced by something greater, that he can never comprehend. However, by neglecting his family, Genjūrō failed to appreciate he has already been blessed with a good life, and in the process, loses it.

As a ghost story, the film delves into a relationship between a spirit and a living person, which runs contrary to nature and will lead to the death of the person. Although ghosts are not mentioned in the initial parts of the film, Japanese writer Kazushi Hosaka stated Mizoguchi foreshadowed it using the scenery, which suggests a detachment from real life. The scene where the protagonists cross Lake Biwa is an example, given the fogs that turn the film away from the jidaigeki genre. Professor Robin Wood argues that the film's depiction of the main ghost character evolves from the mere demon of "The Lust of the White Serpent" into the more humane and tragic Lady Wakasa, and this makes the story more complex. Wood further opines the combination of the story with "The House in the Thicket," combining the male protagonist of each tale into one character, Genjūrō, also connects the demon character and the ghost wife. Both Lady Wakasa and Miyagi are killed by a male-dominated society, and both are wronged by Genjūrō. Wood believes Ugetsu can be considered a feminist film for its exploration of the negative impact of a patriarchy.

Genjūrō's pottery is also a major theme in the film. Professor Wood argues his pottery evolves in three phases, reflecting Mizoguchi's changing approach to filmmaking. Genjūrō begins making the pottery for commercial reasons, shifts to pure aesthetics while isolated with Lady Wakasa, and finally moves on to a style that reflects life and strives to understand it.

== Release ==
Ugetsu was released in Japan on 26 March 1953. It was shown at the 1953 Venice Film Festival. Accompanied by Yoda and Kinuyo Tanaka, Mizoguchi made his first trip outside Japan to attend the festival. He spent much of his time in Italy in his hotel room praying to a scroll with a portrait of Kannon for victory. While in Venice he met director William Wyler, whose film Roman Holiday was also screening in competition at the festival and was rumoured to be the winner of the Silver Lion for best director. The film opened in New York City on 7 September 1954, with the English title Ugetsu being a truncation of Ugetsu Monogatari, the Japanese title, from Ueda's book. It was distributed elsewhere in the United States by Harrison Pictures under the title Tales of Ugetsu on 20 September 1954.

In September 2006, Film Forum screened the film in New York City over six days, opening a Mizoguchi tribute. A 4K digital restoration also screened as part of the Cannes Classics section at the 2016 Cannes Film Festival, Il Cinema Ritrovato in Bologna, and the 2016 New York Film Festival. The restoration "was undertaken by The Film Foundation and Kadokawa Corporation at Cineric Laboratories in New York".

=== Home media ===
Ugetsu was released on VHS by Home Vision Entertainment, with English subtitles. The film was released on LaserDisc in the United States by Voyager Company on November 24, 1993. On 8 November 2005, the film became available for the first time on Region 1 DVD when the Criterion Collection released a two-disc edition of the film, which includes numerous special features such as a 150-minute documentary on Mizoguchi, Kenji Mizoguchi: The Life of a Film Director, directed by Kaneto Shindo. The box-set also includes a booklet with an essay by Keiko I. McDonald, the author of Mizoguchi and editor of Ugetsu, and the three short stories from which the film draws inspiration. The film was released on Blu-Ray through the Criterion Collection years later, with all the features included.

In April 2008, Ugetsu Monogatari was released in the U.K. on Region 2 DVD by Eureka Entertainment as part of their Masters of Cinema series. The two-disc special edition containing new transfers is released in a double pack which twins it with Mizoguchi's film Miss Oyu (1951). This U.K. set was released on Blu-ray on 23 April 2012.

== Reception ==
=== Critical reception ===
On the review aggregator site Rotten Tomatoes, 100% of 32 critics' reviews are positive, with an average rating of 9.40/10. The site's critical consensus states, "With its thought-provoking themes, rich atmosphere, and brilliant direction, Kenji Mizoguchi's Ugetsu monogatari [sic] is a towering classic of world cinema".

Ugetsu is often regarded as a masterwork of Japanese cinema and a definitive piece during Japan's Golden Age of Film. It is one of a number of films arguably more popular in western countries than in Japan. Japanese film historian Tadao Satō remarked that while this film, along with Mizoguchi's other works of the period The Crucified Lovers and Sansho the Bailiff, was probably not meant specifically to be sold to westerners as an "exotic" piece, it was perceived by studio executives as the kind of film that would not necessarily make a profit in Japanese theaters but would win awards at international film festivals.

The film was immediately popular in western countries and praised by such film critics as Lindsay Anderson and Donald Richie. Richie called it "one of the most perfect movies in the history of Japanese cinema" and especially praised the beauty and morality of the film's opening and closing shots. Richie analyzed how the film starts with "a long panorama" and shots spanning from a lake to the shore and the village. He judged the ending's "upward tilting panorama" from the grave to above to reflect the beginning. Bosley Crowther, in The New York Times, wrote that the film had "a strangely obscure, inferential, almost studiedly perplexing quality". Variety staff praised the film's visuals for reminiscence to Japanese prints, costumes and set design, and the performances of Masayuki Mori and Machiko Kyō.

The film appeared twice in Sight & Sound magazine's top 10 critics poll of the greatest films ever made, which is held once every decade, in 1962 and 1972. In the 2012 Sight & Sound poll, it was voted the 50th greatest film of all time. In the 2022 Sight & Sound critic's poll, it was voted at 90th place. Roger Ebert added Ugetsu to his Great Movies list in 2004, calling it "one of the greatest of all films", and said that "At the end of Ugetsu, aware we have seen a fable, we also feel curiously as if we have witnessed true lives and fates". Director Martin Scorsese has also listed it as one of his favourite films of all time and included it on a list of "39 Essential Foreign Films for a Young Filmmaker." It was also listed by Russian filmmaker Andrei Tarkovsky as one of his top ten favorite films.

In 5001 Nights at the Movies, film critic Pauline Kael found it to be "subtle, violent yet magical", and termed Ugetsu as "one of the most amazing of the Japanese movies that played American art houses". In 2000, The Village Voice newspaper ranked Ugetsu 29th on their list of the 100 best films of the 20th century.

=== Accolades ===
Ugetsu won the Silver Lion Award for Best Direction at the Venice Film Festival in 1953. The night before, Mizoguchi, believing that if the film did not win an award the shame would prevent him from returning to Japan, stayed in his hotel room and prayed. In Japan it was named third in Kinema Junpo's Best Ten for Japanese films of 1953. and won two awards at the 8th Mainichi Film Awards.

Award	Date of ceremony	Category	Recipient(s)	Result	Ref(s)
Academy Awards	21 March 1956	Best Costume Design, Black and White	Tadaoto Kainosho	Nominated	
Kinema Junpo Awards	1953	Best Ten	Ugetsu Monogatari	Won	
Mainichi Film Awards	1953	Best Sound Recording	Iwao Ōtani	Won	
Mainichi Film Awards	1953	Best Art Direction	Kisaku Itō	Won	
Ministry of Education	1953	Cinematography	Kazuo Miyagawa	Won	
Venice Film Festival	20 August – 4 September 1953	Silver Lion	Kenji Mizoguchi	Won	
Venice Film Festival	20 August – 4 September 1953	Pasinetti Award	Kenji Mizoguchi	Won	

== Legacy ==
Along with Akira Kurosawa's film Rashomon (1950), Ugetsu is credited with having popularised Japanese cinema in the West. The film, and Yasujirō Ozu's Tokyo Story, released the same year, particularly created awareness of other Japanese filmmakers. Mizoguchi cemented his reputation among film aficionados in Europe with his film Sansho the Bailiff (1954). Ugetsu and Sansho the Bailiff made an impact on French New Wave directors Jean-Luc Godard and François Truffaut, and U.S. director Paul Schrader, who sought Kazuo Miyagawa for advice on the film Mishima: A Life in Four Chapters (1985). Indian filmmaker Rajendra Nath Shukla's Mrig Trishna (1975) is inspired by Ugetsu Monogatari.

== See also ==
- List of ghost films
