= Tadaoto Kainosho =

Japanese actor and costume designer

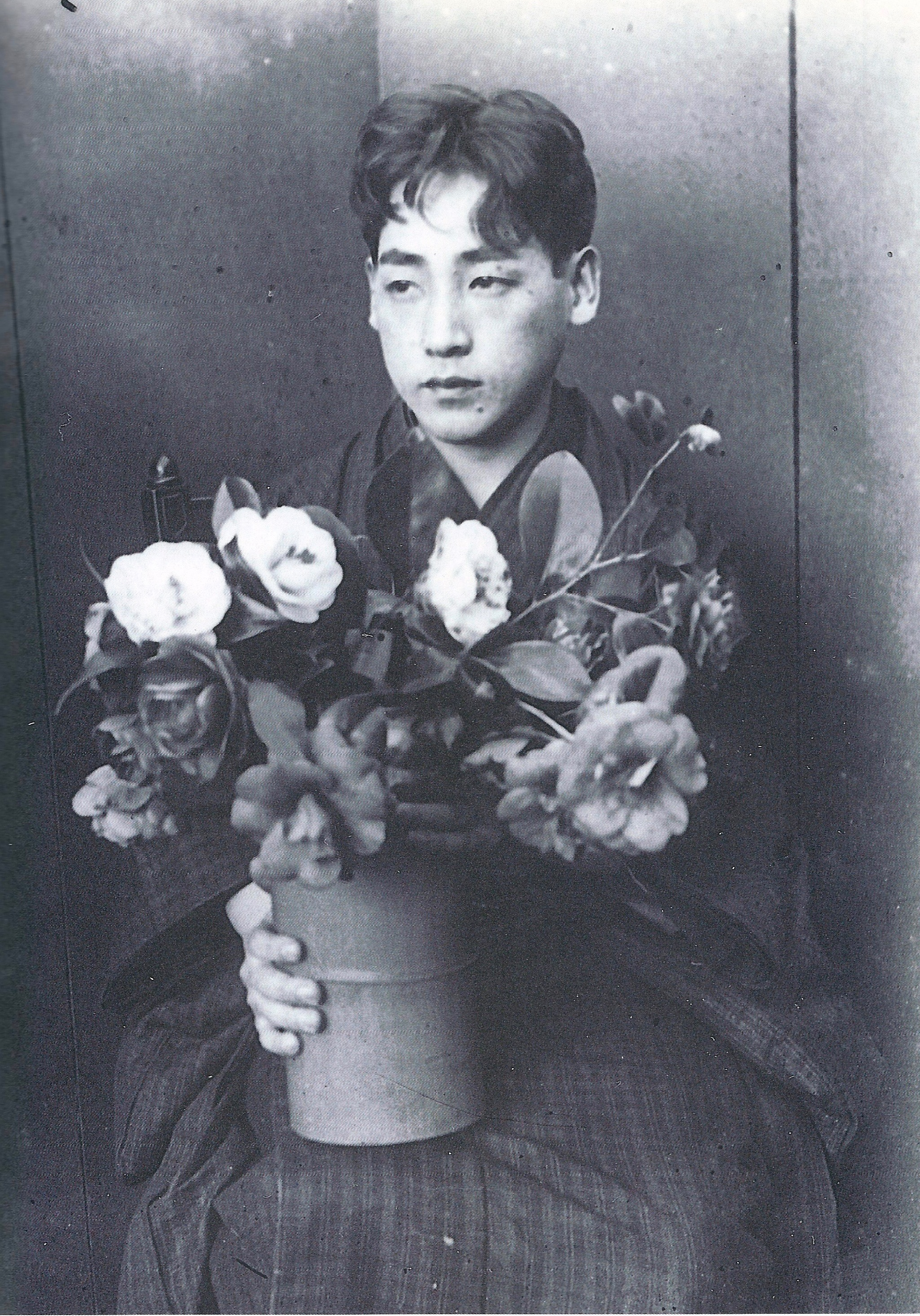
Photo of Tadaoto Kainosho

Tadaoto Kainosho (December 23, 1894 – June 16, 1978) was a Japanese actor and costume designer. He was nominated for the Academy Award for Best Costume Design for his work in the jidaigeki film Ugetsu (1953).
