= Yomihon =

Japanese literary genre

Yomihon (読本, yomi-hon; "reading books") is a type of Japanese book from the Edo period (1603–1867). Unlike other Japanese books of the periods, such as kusazōshi, they had few illustrations, and the emphasis was on the text. In storylines, Buddhist ethics such as karma are often preached, and characters with supernatural powers and imaginary creatures are often depicted.

From the end of the 16th century to the 18th century, Chinese novels such as Water Margin were translated and published in Japan. The mutual influence of Chinese novel styles, Japanese traditional war chronicles gunki monogatari, Buddhist tales, and Jitsurokumono based on social incidents promoted the stylization of yomihon and, in 1749, Tsuga Teishō published Hanabusasōshi establishing the style of yomihon. Takebe Ayatari, and Okajima Kanzan were also instrumental in developing the yomihon.

Another early pioneer of the yomihon was Ueda Akinari, with his Ugetsu Monogatari and Harusame Monogatari. Kyokutei Bakin wrote the extremely popular fantasy/historical romance Nansō Satomi Hakkenden, in addition to other yomihon. Santō Kyōden wrote yomihon mostly set in the pleasure quarters until the Kansei Edicts banned such works.

== History ==
=== Overview ===
Yomihon as a genre was marked by its use of text heavy format, that often-left little room for illustrations. It was written in a Kanji-laden style, that frequently borrowed from Chinese elements. This meant that only the most educated readers of the Edo period would be able to read most Yomihon, which meant that Yomihon was not written for profit, but instead as an art. Most Yomihon were not original works, but instead adapted from Chinese stories, which can be argued that Yomihon are just Chinese mythology with a Japanese styling done. Since in the Edo period Chinese culture was viewed in high regard, this made Yomihon popular among the higher classes to seem more sophisticated. In addition, to escape censorship, Yomihon was written as historical fiction to avoid using real people, while still containing commentary about the state of Japan. This often included criticisms of government, popular social practices and the social hierarchy of Edo Period Japan.

=== Early Yomihon ===
The precursors to the Edo-style Yomihon writing are often considered to be Ueda Akinari and Takebe Ayatari. Ayatari is considered to be the father of Edo-style Yomihon, with his first book Nishiyome Monogatari, which was cast in a historical setting, setting the trend of historical fiction writing. At around the same time, Akinari published Ugetsu Monogatari, and thought of himself to be rivals with Ayatari. His works focused on the vanity of human wishes, and the suffering war leaves behind. Akinari also relished in the complex nature of Yomihon, and hated the other popular genres of time, and is quoted as saying Lady Murasaki deserves to be doomed to hell for writing the Tale of Genji.

=== Middle Yomihon ===
Middle Yomihon developed further on the progress made before it, with authors like Itan Ohie’en publishing multiple collections based on Chinese tales. Tsuga Teisho published a historical fiction called Yoshitsune Banjaku-den, and his writing relied on Chinese influence less. In addition, another author called Shoshu wrote Shochu hachiyuden, which the title directly anticipated Bakin’s work of Nanso Satomi Hakkenden.

=== Late Yomihon ===
Yomihon will take its ultimate form in the hands of Santo Kyoden and Takizawa Bakin. Their stories were complex with unified plots, didactic tones, character development, supernatural elements, and seamlessly combined colloquial and Chinese elements. Bakin himself wrote more than 30 Yomihon borrowing much from his precursors, while also having his own originality. He wrote famous Yomihon like Nanso Satomi Hakkenden, considered to be the pinnacle of Yomihon. Bakin was the student of Kyoden, and in many places, considered his spiritual successor. As Kyoden’s health began to decline, Bakin’s work grew in popularity and readily took its place.

Kyoden’s first Yomihon was Takao Senjimon, which based its structure on a Chinese piece Shui Hu Chuan. Following that, he wrote Chushin Suikoden, which Bakin highly praised. It was also criticized for relying too heavily on Kyoden’s Kibyoshi writing skills but praised by critics on his writing skill and adaptation, but not on the content. His next work was Asaka no Numa, which is a revenge story, which was becoming popular in Japan at the time it was written. His next popular work was Udonge Monogatari, which was important for its use of Buddhist moral themes and karmic retribution. As Kyoden’s student, those themes made its way into Bakin’s works and created what can be considered one the best Yomihon written, Nanso Satomi Hakkenden. In it, the themes of karmic retribution, revenge plotlines, reinforcement of good and chastising of evil and adaptation of Chinese literature all find their place to create a cohesive and wildly successful Yomihon.

== See also ==
- Japanese literature
