= Ueda Akinari =

Japanese author, scholar and poet (1734–1809)

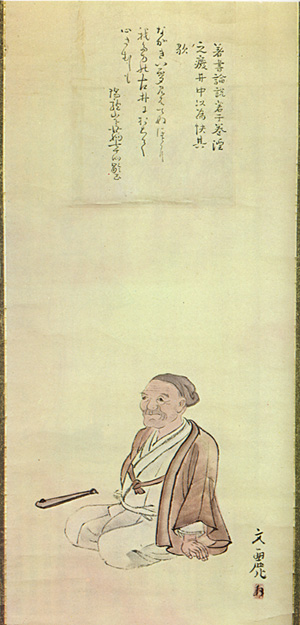
Portrait of Ueda Akinari by Koga Bunrei

Ueda Akinari or Ueda Shūsei (上田 秋成; Japanese pronunciation: [ɯ.e.da (|) a.kʲiꜜ.na.ɾʲi], July 25, 1734 in Osaka – August 8, 1809 in Kyoto) was a Japanese author, scholar and waka poet, and a prominent literary figure in 18th-century Japan. He was an early writer in the yomihon genre and his two masterpieces, Ugetsu Monogatari ("Tales of Rain and the Moon") and Harusame Monogatari ("Tales of Spring Rain"), are central to the canon of Japanese literature.

== Biography ==
Born to an Osaka prostitute and an unknown father, Ueda was adopted in his fourth year by a wealthy merchant who reared him in comfort and provided him with a good education. As a child he became gravely ill with smallpox, and although he survived, he was left with deformed fingers on both hands. During his illness, his parents prayed to the god of the Kashima Inari Shrine, and Ueda felt that this deity had intervened and saved his life. Throughout his life he remained a strong believer in the supernatural, and this belief seems to inform important elements of his literature and scholarship such as his most famous work, a collection of ghost stories titled Ugetsu Monogatari.

He inherited the Ueda family oil and paper business when his adoptive father died. However, he was not a successful merchant, and he lost the business to a fire after running it unhappily for ten years. During this time, he published several humorous stories in the ukiyo-zōshi style, literally translated as "tales of the floating world".

Taking the fire as opportunity to leave the business world, Ueda began studying medicine under Tsuga Teishō, who in addition to teaching Ueda to be a doctor also taught him about colloquial Chinese fiction. In 1776 he began to practice medicine and also published Ugetsu Monogatari. This work places Ueda alongside Takizawa Bakin among the most prominent writers of yomihon — a new genre that represented a dramatic change in reading practices from the popular fiction that came before it.

In addition to his fiction, Ueda was involved in the field of research known as kokugaku, the study of philology and classical Japanese literature. Kokugaku was often typified by a rejection of foreign influences on Japanese culture, notably Chinese language, Buddhism and Confucianism. Ueda took a highly independent position within these circles, and his vigorous polemical dispute with the leading scholar of the movement, Motoori Norinaga, is recorded in the latter's dialogue Kagaika (呵刈葭 1787–1788). Some argue that Ueda also worked out this conflict in stories such as those appearing in Ugetsu Monogatari by beginning his stories grounded on Chinese stories and moral and intellectual discourses and that he then foregrounded a Japanese sensibility by calling on supernatural elements and having his characters feel deep emotion (as opposed to Chinese reliance on the intellect).

In the years after his wife's death in 1798 he experienced temporary blindness, and although eventually sight returned to his left eye from that point on he had to dictate much of his writing. It was at this time that he began working on his second yomihon, and he finished the first two stories of what would be Harusame Monogatari ("Tales of the Spring Rain") in around 1802. Harusame is quite different from Ugetsu Monogatari. Among other differences, Harusame does not invoke the supernatural, and the stories are of greatly varied length. The story titled Hankai is about a disreputable ruffian who suddenly converts to Buddhism and spends the rest of his life as a monk.

In 1809, Ueda died at the age of 76 in Kyoto.

== Modern References ==
Ueda Akinari is discussed in Haruki Murakami's Killing Commendatore. The main character in Murakami's novel shares Akinari's experience of the supernatural. Akinari's story Fate Over Two Generations plays out in modern-day in Murakami's novel.

Indian Filmmaker AK Srikanth's film 'Dvija' (2022) is said to be inspired by Ueda Akinari's work.

Ueda Akinari appears as a character in chapter 123 of the manga Bungo Stray Dogs.

== Works ==
- Ugetsu Monogatari ("Tales of Rain and the Moon") (1776)
- Harusame Monogatari (春雨物語, Harusame monogatari) (1809)

== See also ==
- Kyokutei Bakin
- Edo period
- Ugetsu
