= Harusame Monogatari =

The Harusame Monogatari (kanji: 春雨物語, hiragana: はるさめものがたり, translated as "The Tales of Spring Rain" (less commonly "Tales of the Spring Rain") is the second famous collection of Japanese stories by Ueda Akinari after the Ugetsu Monogatari ("Tales of Moonlight and Rain").

The collection of ten stories is part of the yomihon genre of Japanese literature, which is a notable representative of Japan's contribution to the world's Early Modern literature, though this second collection of Ueda's was not printed until a century after his death in 1907. The 1907 printing was based on an incomplete manuscript, and the full edition was not published till 1950.

== Contents ==
The semi-historical stories reflect Akinari's kokugaku interests in historical fiction.

- Chikatabira (血かたびら, The Bloody Robe) - historical
- Amatsu otome (天津処女, The Amatsu Maid) - historical
- Kaizoku (海賊, The Pirate) - historical
- Nise no en (二世の縁, The Destiny That Spanned Two Lifetimes)- also known as "The Marriage Bond." The story of a relationship reincarnated by means of Sokushinbutsu.
- Me hitotsu no kami (目ひとつの神, The One-eyed God) - historical
- Shinikubi no egao (死首の咲顔, The Smile on the Face of the Corpse)
- Suteishi maru (捨石丸, The Ship Suteishi) - the name of the lost vessel Suteishi means a discarded stone in a Japanese rock garden, or a sacrificed stone in the board game Go.
- Miyagi ga tsuka (宮木が塚, The Grave of Miyagi)
- Uta no homare (歌のほまれ, In Praise of Song) - historical
- Hankai (樊噲) - "a picaresque narrative of the eventful life of a young man ... who later calls himself Hankai" (Jackman, 1975)

== Comparisons with Ugetsu Monogatari ==
Both collections share Akinari's "kokugaku-inspired delight in the mysterious and problematic". Unlike Ugetsu Monogatari the Harusame Monogatari is not essentially a collection of ghost stories. The elegant style of the earlier collection is replaced with a terse "sometimes choppy" style.

== Translations ==
- Tales of the Spring Rain: Harusame Monogatari by Ueda Akinari. 249 pages. University of Tokyo Press (1975)
