= Fumio Yanoguchi =

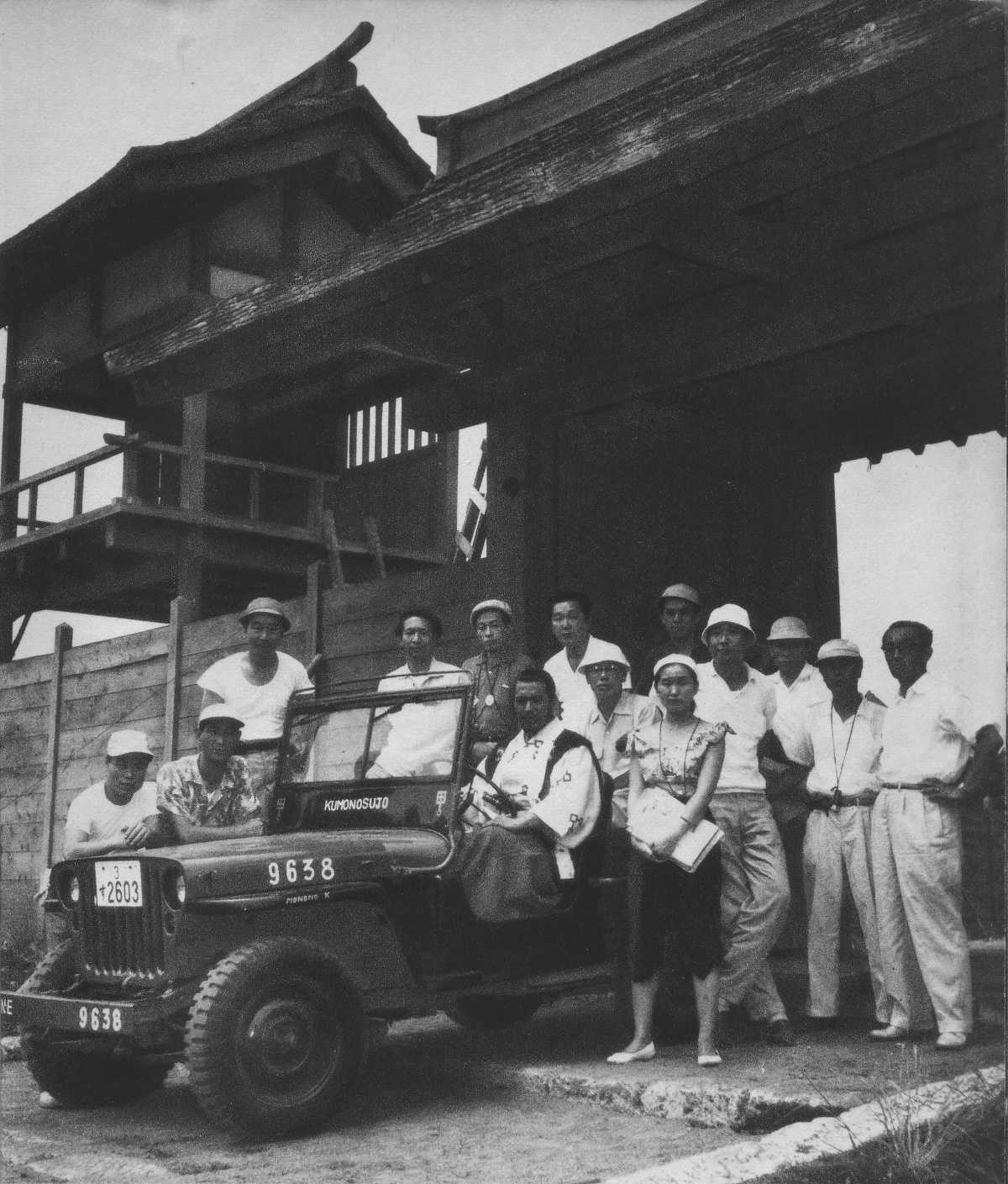
- Born: 29 September 1917
- Died: 15 January 1985 (aged 67)
- Occupation: recording engineer

Fumio Yanoguchi (Japanese: 矢野口 文雄, Hepburn: Yanoguchi Fumio; 29 September 1917 – 15 January 1985) was a Japanese recording engineer known for his work with film director Akira Kurosawa.

Yanoguchi began working with Kurosawa on the 1949 film Stray Dog, and afterwards began recording the sound for the vast majority of Kurosawa's films until dying late in the production of Ran in 1985. He won the Mainichi Film Award for Best Sound Recording for the 1952 film Ikiru. Yanoguchi also worked on Godzilla films such as Mothra vs. Godzilla (1964) and Godzilla vs. Gigan (1972).

== Filmography ==
His work includes:

- Stray Dog (1949)
- Ikiru (1952)
- Seven Samurai (1954)
- I Live in Fear (1955)
- The Lower Depths (1957)
- Throne of Blood (1957)
- The Hidden Fortress (1958)
- The Bad Sleep Well (1960)
- High and Low (1963)
- Mothra vs. Godzilla (1964)
- Dodes'ka-den (1970)
- Godzilla vs. Gigan (1972)
- Godzilla vs. Mechagodzilla (1974)
- Kagemusha (1980)
- Ran (1985)
