= Iwao Ōtani =

Japanese recording engineer

- Born: 1919
- Died: August 3, 2017 (aged 97–98)
- Occupation: Recording engineer
- Awards: Mainichi Film Award for Best Sound Recording

Iwao Ōtani (Japanese: 大谷 巌, Hepburn: Ōtani Iwao; 1919 – August 3, 2017) was a Japanese recording engineer who worked with influential film directors Akira Kurosawa and Kenji Mizoguchi.

Ōtani worked on Kurosawa's 1950 film Rashomon in Kyoto. Due to setbacks and some lost audio, the crew took the urgent step of bringing actor Toshiro Mifune back to the studio after filming to record another line, which Ōtani added to the film along with the music, using a different microphone.

He won the Mainichi Film Award for Best Sound Recording for the 1953 film Ugetsu. In 2000, he worked on the sound for Kon Ichikawa's film Dora-heita.

Ōtani died of cerebral infarction on August 3, 2017.
