= Ugetsu Monogatari =

Book by Ueda Akinari

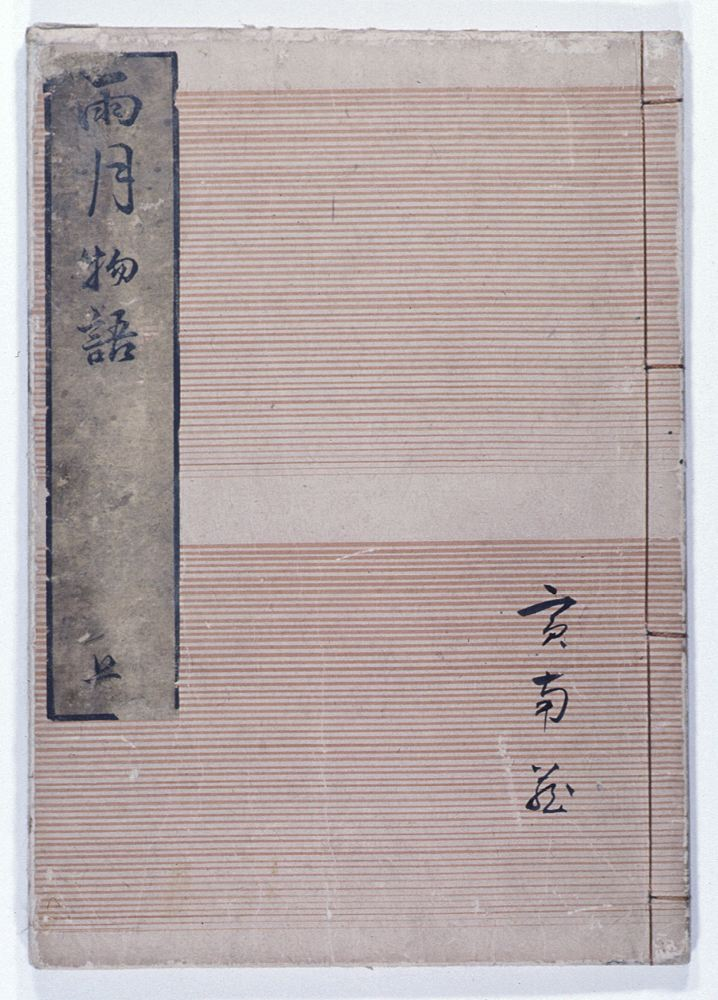
The cover of the fourth edition published by Shichiro Kawachiya

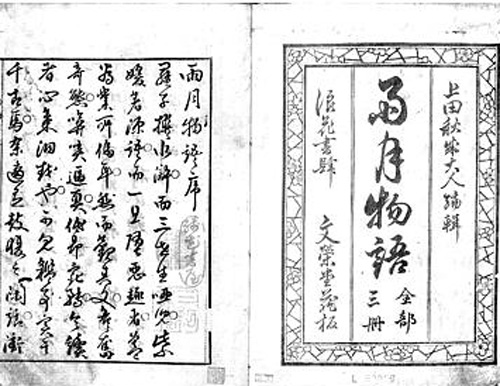
Inside the fourth edition

Ugetsu Monogatari (雨月物語, Tales of Moonlight and Rain) is a collection of nine supernatural tales first published in 1776. It is the best known work of Japanese author Ueda Akinari.

Largely adapted from traditional Japanese and Chinese ghost stories, the collection is among the most important works of Edo period (1603–1867) and kaidan literature, and is considered a predecessor of the yomihon genre. Kenji Mizoguchi's award-winning film Ugetsu (1953), credited with helping popularize Japanese cinema in the West, was adapted from two of the collection's stories.

== Title ==
The word Ugetsu is a compound word; u (雨) means "rain", while getsu (月) translates to "moon". It derives from a passage in the book's preface describing "a night with a misty moon after the rains", and references a Noh play, also called Ugetsu, which also employs the common contemporary symbols of rain and moon. These images evoked the supernatural and mysterious in East Asian literature; Qu You's Mudan Deng Ji (Chinese: 牡丹燈記; a story from Jiandeng Xinhua, one of Ueda's major sources), indicates that a rainy night or a morning moon may presage the coming of supernatural beings.

Use of the term monogatari (物語) in the title, meaning "story" or "series", connects the book to other significant works of Japanese and Chinese literature by which it was strongly influenced, such as The Tale of Genji (Genji monogatari) and Inga Monogatari. The use of this naming convention is particularly notable, because it had become less popular in Ueda's time with the rise of ukiyo-zōshi.

Tales of Moonlight and Rain is the most common English translation; other translations include Tales of a Clouded Moon and Tales of Rain and the Moon.

== Publication ==
Ugetsu Monogatari was first published in a 1776 woodblock edition, although its preface is dated 1768. The nine stories were published in five volumes:

- Volume 1: Shiramine and Kikka no chigiri
- Volume 2: Asaji ga Yado and Muo no Rigyo
- Volume 3: Bupposo and Kibitsu no Kama
- Volume 4: Jasei no In
- Volume 5: Aozukin and Hinpiku-ron

In writing the book, Ueda played with the differences between colloquial and classical language, incorporating double meanings and word play into his text by pairing furigana (Japanese phonetic readings) with classical Chinese words and phrases.

Ueda published Ugetsu Monogatari under the pen name Senshi Kijin (剪枝畸人); Senshi (剪枝) meaning "cut finger" or "pruning" and Kijin (畸人) meaning "eccentric" or "cripple". While he used the name Senshi Kijin just once, this was not the only time Ueda used a pen name that referenced his disability, one finger on each of his hands having been permanently deformed by a severe case of smallpox he had as a child.

Despite being published under a pen name, Takizawa Bakin's later attribution of the work to Ueda is now undisputed.

Ugetsu Monogatari is considered a predecessor of the yomihon genre of Edo-period literature. Its popularity has been enduring and it is still being adapted into new works in the 21st century.

== Literary context and influences ==
=== Adapted novels ===
Ugetsu Monogatari is a hon'an shosetsu (adapted novel). It was part of a new genre of books that had become popular in the 18th century: translations of Chinese stories adapted to fit into Japanese culture and historical settings. The stories in Ugetsu Monogatari were pulled from various Chinese story collections, including Jiandeng Xinhua and Clear Words to Illuminate the World. Since others had already adapted these stories, Ueda was able to draw, not only from the original stories, but also from the existing adaptations. This was not viewed as plagiarism, as "the notion of the artist prevalent in [his] time defined [literary] practice as one involving an adaptation of the tradition." His writing was praised for its unique take on the existing stories.

In his reinterpretation of these stories, Ueda recast them as historical tales set in Japan, weaving together elements of the source stories with a rich array of references to historical events, personages, and literary works, as well as Japanese folklore and religion. Notably, Ueda, a devoted kokugaku scholar, went farther than his contemporaries in changing the source material to remove evidence of its Chinese origins.

=== Kokugaku scholarship ===
Ueda's kokugaku beliefs led him to adapt the stories in ways that were different from, and sometimes counter to, the ways his Confucian and Buddhist peers did. Like other members of the kokugaku movement, he utilized fiction as a tool to reinvigorate Japan's past, by bringing to life the aesthetics of antiquity in the present. At the same time, he presents in Ugetsu Monogatari some of the moral views of the kokugaku school. Ueda's version of Shiramine is a particularly strong example of this. Discarding Confucian and Buddhist readings of the story, Ueda uses the protagonist as a mouthpiece for his kokugaku interpretation of the legend of Emperor Sutoku, ascribing the cause of the emperor's tragedy to the infiltration of foreign, and especially Confucian, ideologies.

=== Borrowed components ===
Ugetsu Monogatari draws heavily from other books, borrowing imagery, references, structures, stylistic choices, and more from famous works including Inga Monogatari, A Garland of Heroes, Otogi Boko, Ise Monogatari, Nihon Ryōiki, and Konjaku Monogatarishū. Japanese literature researcher Noriko T. Reider observed that "more than sixty passages in Ugetsu Monogatari are derived from Chinese literature, while over a hundred are taken from Japanese literature." In particular, Ueda borrowed so heavily from The Tale of Genji that certain sentences in Ugetsu Monogatari seem to have been directly lifted from it.

=== Noh theater ===
Influence from Noh theater can be found woven throughout Ugetsu Monogatari. Within each story, the characters fit into the traditional shite (lead actor) and waki (supporting actor) roles of Noh plays and the acts are arranged using the jo-ha-kyū dramatic structure made famous in Noh. In addition, "by subject, [the stories] are arranged according to the order of a single-day's Noh program, in sequence: plays of gods, warriors, women, mad person (or miscellaneous present plays), and demons."

The stories Shiramine and Jasei no In take their interpretations of the folktales they are based on from specific Noh plays that are adaptations of the same stories.

=== Kaidan ===
Ugetsu Monogatari is one of the best-known and most highly regarded kaidan-shu, collections of supernatural or ghost stories that became popular in Japan during the Edo period. It utilizes elements from all three primary types of kaidan: adaptations of Chinese stories, Buddhist ghost stories, and Japanese folk-tales. Despite the collection's popularity, these are the only kaidan Ueda ever published.

During the Edo period, Japan enjoyed a period of peace and stability after the end of the turbulent Sengoku period and, with the emergence of an increasingly interconnected economy that connected rural and urban areas, kaidan experienced a shift "in the direction of entertainment from the overtly religious or didactic". Many Chinese kaidan were translated and adapted into Japanese culture during this time and were secularized in the process, including tales from Suzuki Shōsan's Inga Monogatari (1661) and Asai Ryōi's Otogi Bōko (1666), which would go on to influence the writing of Ugetsu Monogatari.

Ueda continued this trend of secularization in Ugetsu Monogatari, removing certain religious elements from stories such as Asaji ga Yado and Kibitsu no Kama. He references his non-didactic approach to fiction writing in the preface of the book, joking that, unlike other well-known authors such as Lo Kuan-chung and Murasaki Shikibu, whom some Confucian and Buddhist scholars of the time believed had received divine punishment for leading readers astray, he was safe from divine punishment because no one was expected to believe his writing to be truthful.

The secularization of kaidan was amplified by an interest among intellectuals of the time, especially among Neo-Confucianists, in using logic grounded in Confucian yin-yang theory to find mundane explanations for supernatural phenomena. Ueda, however, rejected mundane explanations for supernatural phenomena, believing that only Japanese folk belief could explain such events. Despite this, he did not remove all the religious elements from the stories; Aozukin, in particular, follows the tradition of Buddhist setsuwa storytelling.

== Stories ==
=== Shiramine (白峯, White Peak) ===
In Shiramine, a retelling of the legend of Emperor Sutoku through a kokugaku lens, a monk meets the ghost of Emperor Sutoku at a shrine in Matsuyama. The emperor vents his anger at the imperial family members that deposed him but fails to sway the monk to his side. Instead, the monk criticizes him for having allowed himself to be swayed by foreign doctrine. Enraged, the emperor transforms into a giant tengu bird and flies away. The end of the story summarizes the various historical events that were attributed to Sutoku's vengeful spirit after his death.

The story draws heavily from Noh theater. It was inspired by the play Matsuyama Tengu, and closely fits the structure of "dream Noh" (mugen no) plays, which feature protagonists who have died but not yet been able to move on to the afterlife. It follows the jo-ha-kyū act arrangement made famous in Noh theatre. The story also shows influence from Inga Monogatari and A Garland of Heroes.

Prominent Japanese literary scholar Donald Keene argued that the value of Shiramine lies in its "overpowering beauty of style", which may be difficult to parse when read in translation or without the necessary historical context.

Shiramine is the name of a mountain on Shikoku, the island where the city of Matsuyama is located.

=== Kikka no Chigiri (菊花の約, The Chrysanthemum Pledge) ===
In Kikka no Chigiri, a warrior falls ill while trying to return from a mission on behalf of his lord and becomes dear friends with the man who nurses him back to health. He recovers and leaves for home, promising his friend to return on the day of the Chrysanthemum Festival. Upon arriving home, he discovers that his lord has been killed and his throne overtaken by a rival, to whom everyone, including his own cousin, has now switched their allegiance. Not wanting to serve the new lord, the warrior tries to leave to return to his friend but his cousin holds him prisoner. Rather than break his promise, he kills himself and returns to his friend on the day of the Chrysanthemum Festival as a ghost. Afterward, his friend travels to the warrior's home and lectures the cousin on loyalty before abruptly killing him in revenge for the death of his friend.

The tale was adapted from the Chinese story Fan Chu-ch'ing Chi-shu Ssu-sheng-chiao (Fan Chu-ch'ing: A Meal of Chicken and Millet, A Friendship of Life and Death), from the anthology Yu-shih Ming-yen (Clear Words to Illuminate the World).

In adapting the story, Ueda changed the protagonist from a merchant to a warrior and changed the protagonist's reason for not keeping his promise from forgetting to being held prisoner.

=== Asagi ga Yado (浅茅が宿, The House in the Reeds) ===
Asagi ga Yado, set in the year 1452, tells the tale of an irresponsible man who leaves his devoted wife behind to try to rebuild his fortune selling silk in the capital. That summer, a war breaks out and the residents of his home village flee. The wife stays at home to wait for her husband despite the danger and is devastated when he does not return in Autumn as he had promised. She stays alone in the abandoned village, desperately trying to fend off bandits, rapists, and starvation. Meanwhile, her husband is robbed on his way back to her and then falls seriously ill, preventing him from returning. He is treated well in the village where he is cared for during his illness and ends up staying there. Seven years later, the man decides to return to his home village to see what became of his wife. His village is mostly abandoned and unrecognizable, except for his home, which is in good repair and where he finds his wife, worn by the years but alive and waiting for him. After a joyful and tearful reunion, the two fall asleep together. When the man awakes the next morning, he discovers that the house is in ruins and all that is left of their marital bedroom is the grave of his long-dead wife, whose ghost he had seen the night before. He finds an old man, the sole resident who had been there since before the war, who tells him the story of his wife's death and compares it to the legend of Mama no Tekona.

The story is an adaptation of The Tale of Ai-Ching from the 14th century Chinese story collection Chien Teng Hsin Hua (New Stories After Snuffing the Lamp), which had previously been adapted by Ueda's predecessor Asai Ryoi in Otogi Boko. It was also inspired by a similar story from Konjaku Monogatari. It includes a reference to a poem from Ise Monogatari.

Ueda added more definitive personality traits to the protagonist, made him more personally responsible for the tragedy, and removed the reincarnation aspect, among other changes from the original story.

It is the first of the two stories on which the film Ugetsu is based.

=== Muo no Rigyo (夢応の鯉魚, The Carp That Appeared in My Dream) ===
In Muo no Rigyo, a monk who loves painting fish cannot stand to see them killed, so he often pays fishermen to free the fish they have been caught. One day he falls asleep while painting and has a vivid dream of playing with fish in the river. Upon waking, he makes a painting of the fish from his dream and names it A Carp That Appeared in My Dream. Later he gets sick and, while he is unconscious, the god of the sea grants his wish of being reincarnated as a carp, as a reward for having saved so many fish during his lifetime. But, while he is a fish, one of his friends captures and eats him. The monk returns to his human body and confronts the friend who ate him.

=== Bupposo (仏法僧, Bird of Paradise) ===
In Bupposo, a man and his son encounter the ghosts of Toyotomi Hidetsugu and his court while camping on Mount Kōya at night. The man is delighted to find that the ghosts share his love of poetry and antiquity studies; they spend the night discussing these things.

Like Shiramine, the story's main focus is on poetry and discussions of history and literature.

=== Kibitsu no Kama (吉備津の釜, The Cauldron of Kibitsu) ===
In Kibitsu no Kama, an irresponsible man abandons his dutiful wife for a prostitute. His wife kills the prostitute with her vengeful spirit. The wife then dies and continues to pursue her ill-fated husband as a ghost. The remainder of the story chronicles the man's attempts to combat his wife's ghost.

Kibitsu no Kama is an adaptation of the story Mu-tan Teng-chi, from the 14th century Chinese ghost story anthology Chien Teng Hsin Hua (New Stories After Snuffing the Lamp). Ueda added the love triangle element and, as with Asaji ga Yado, gave his version of the protagonist more distinct personality traits and made him directly responsible for the story's tragedy.

=== Jasei no In (蛇性の婬, Lust of the White Serpent) ===
Jasei no In is a bildungsroman in which a dissolute second son, impoverished due to primogeniture, falls in love with a white snake disguised as a beautiful woman. She is an anima of the protagonist's desires and indiscipline, constantly making trouble for him. Intent on saving his family from suffering at her hands, he traps her in an urn and buries her under Leifeng Pagoda.

A major element of the story is that both the protagonist and the reader are repeatedly misled by the snake woman as she manipulates the protagonist's perspective of reality.

Jasei no In takes inspiration from the Chinese folktale Legend of the White Snake and the Noh play Dōjōji. It is the second of the two stories on which the film Ugetsu is based. It is also the basis for a 1960 film, also called Jasei no In, by Japanese director Morihei Magatani.

=== Aozuki (青頭巾, The Blue Hood) ===
In Aozukin, a traveling Buddhist priest visits a village where he learns that the local priest has become a cannibalistic demon, having gone insane after the death of his young male lover and eaten the lover's body. The demon is now terrorizing the village. The priest confronts the demon, placing a blue priest's hood on its head in order to save it through religious salvation.

The story resembles a Buddhist setsuwa story.

=== Hinpuku-ron (貧福論, Theory of Wealth and Poverty) ===
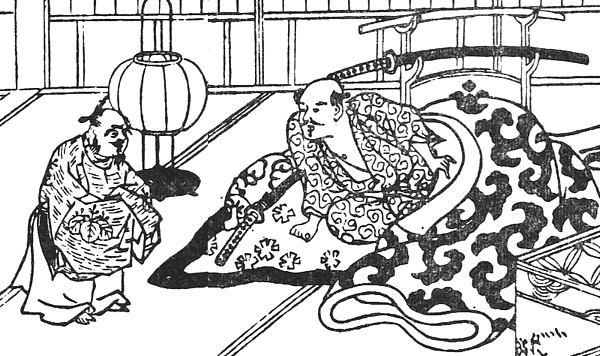
The spirit of money from Hinpuku-ron

In Hinpuku-ron, a money-obsessed but good-humored samurai rewards a servant he discovers has been stashing money away. That night the spirit of his accumulated gold visits him. They discuss moral issues related to wealth.

Hinpuku-ron is set around the year 1595 and was inspired by a real samurai from that era, who was known for being obsessed with money despite the anti-wealth ideals of bushido. The story is part of a wave of Edo period literature about and for merchants and other townspeople, which reflected Japanese society's changing attitude towards profit-making activities, away from the pre-Edo class structure that viewed the merchant class as parasitic. Notably, Ueda himself was of the merchant class.

In the story, the spirit of gold argues that money is inherently neutral, its benefit or harm depending on the moral character of the person possessing it, with the amount of money a person has not necessarily correlating to their morality. The latter point directly contradicted the Buddhist and Confucian teaching common in Ueda's time that wealth is a reward for good behavior in a past life.

Economist and literature researcher Waldemiro Francisco Sorte Junior argued that Hinpuku-ron is one of the many Edo period stories that used a historical setting to veil criticisms of contemporary society and government that could not be said directly because of the censorship laws of the time.

== Translations ==
The first English translation was published by Wilfred Whitehouse in Monumenta Nipponica in 1938 and 1941 under the title Ugetsu Monogatari: Tales of a Clouded Moon. Subsequent English translations have been published by Dale Saunders (1966), Kenji Hamada (1972), Leon Zolbrod (1974) and Anthony H. Chambers (2006).

== Derivative works ==
- Ugetsu: 1953 film based on Asaji ga Yado and Jasei no In, directed by Kenji Mizoguchi. Winner of the Silver Lion Award at the 1953 Venice Film Festival.
- Jasei no In: 1921 film directed by Thomas Kurihara and adapted by Jun'ichirō Tanizaki.
- Takarazuka Revue Ugetsu Monogatari: 1926 play by Harumichi Ono.
- Jasei no In: 1960 film by Japanese director Morihei Magatani.
- Ugetsu: 2006 novel adaptation by Shinji Aoyama.
- Ugetsu Monogatari: 2009 novel adaptation by Shimako Iwai.

== See also ==
- Yomihon
- Monogatari
- Kokugaku
- Takizawa Bakin
- Asai Ryōi
- The Tale of Genji
- The Tales of Ise
- Nihon Ryōiki
- Konjaku Monogatarishū
