= Kazuo Tanaka =

Kazuo Tanaka from the University of Electro-Communications, Tokyo, Japan was named Fellow of the Institute of Electrical and Electronics Engineers (IEEE) in 2014 for contributions to fuzzy control system design and analysis.
