= Continental arc =

Type of volcanic arc occurring along a continental margin

A continental arc is a type of volcanic arc occurring as an "arc-shape" topographic high region along a continental margin. The continental arc is formed at an active continental margin where two tectonic plates meet, and where one plate has continental crust and the other oceanic crust along the line of plate convergence, and a subduction zone develops. The magmatism and petrogenesis of continental crust are complicated: in essence, continental arcs reflect a mixture of oceanic crust materials, mantle wedge and continental crust materials.

== Origin ==
Schematic diagram of the formation of a continental arc.

When two tectonic plates collide, relatively denser oceanic crust will be subducted under relatively lighter continental crust. Because of the subduction process, the relatively cooler oceanic crust, along with water, is subducted to the asthenosphere, where pressures and temperatures are much higher than the surface of Earth. Under such conditions, the downgoing plate releases volatiles such as H_{2}O and CO_{2}, which cause partial melting of the above asthenosphere. This process can create relatively buoyant magma, which subsequently forms a series of volcanoes at the surface along the subduction zone. There are some researchers who argue that refertilization of arc lithospheric mantle may also be an important process associated with arc magmatism. Because the subduction zone (which is also the plate boundary) is generally an arc-shape, geologists named those volcanoes volcanic arcs. A volcanic arc built on continental crust is called a continental arc; when built on oceanic crust the volcanoes form an island arc.

== Petrogenesis and magmatism ==
=== Petrogenesis ===
The origin of igneous rock, or petrogenesis, in continental arcs is more complicated than that in oceanic arcs. The partial melting of the subducting oceanic slab generates primary magma, which would be contaminated by the continental crust materials when it travels through the crust. Because the continental crust is felsic or silica while the juvenile primary magma is typically mafic, the composition of magmas in continental arcs is the product of mixing between igneous differentiation of mafic magmas and felsic or silica crust meltings. The mixing of existing continental crust, lower part of lithosphere or lithospheric mantle under the continental crust, the subducting oceanic crust and sediments, the mantle wedge and the underplates materials together is the main source of continental arc rocks.

=== Magmatism ===
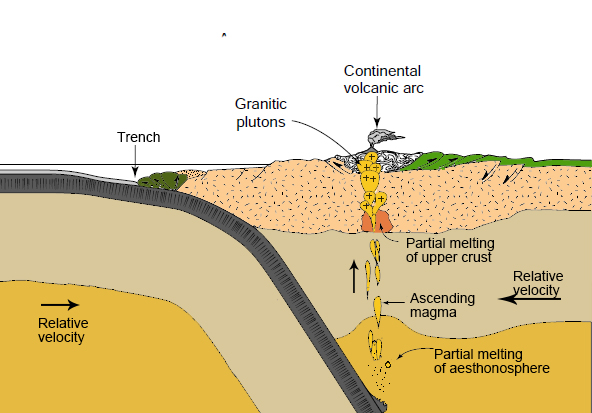
Cross-sectional diagram of magmatic processes in a continental arc

The dehydration of the downgoing slab and the partial melting of asthenosphere together generate the primary magma of continental arcs. Primary magma is composed of olivine tholeiitic basalt because of mixture of peridotites from the mantle wedge and large ion lithophile enriched (LIL-enriched) fluids from the dehydrating subducting plate. Because the larger thickness and lower density, the continental crust is likely to prevent the upwards rising of primary magma. Ascending primary magma is likely to pond at the bottom of continental crust, forming a magma chamber. In this chamber an underplating process will take place, the assimilation and fractional crystallization of primary magma and lower crustal rocks forms underplate at the bottom of crust.

Through those procedure the olivine tholeiitic primary magma would change to calc-alkaline magmas and more evolved and enriched alkaline or siliceous magmas. A further enriched source may be provided by the tectonic erosion process that causes scraping and dragging of lower continental lithosphere into the melting zone. Thus, a high concentrations of Rb, Cs, Ba, K, Th, and LREE (light rare-earth elements) and enriched isotopes can be found in the continental arc magmas.

=== Intensity of arc magmatism ===
The geothermal structure in a subduction zone determines the melting rate of subduction slab and asthenosphere. The change in isotherm structure may have significant impact on the intensity of magmatism. Some factors may contribute to the change in geothermal structure: a) the change in convergence velocity of two plates in subduction zone; b) the dipping angle of subduction slab; c) the amounts of subducted low temperature materials (water and oceanic sediments); d) the mantle/asthenosphere upwelling event (slab window/slab breakoff).

== Petrology ==
The petrogenesis of continental arcs is generally different from that of oceanic arcs, so more calc-alkaline and alkaline rocks can be found at a continental arc, with fewer tholeiites and low-K rocks.

Calc-alkaline phenocryst-rich dacite, andesite and rhyolite rocks are abundant in continental arcs. These rocks contain hydrous minerals biotite and hornblende partially resorbed in magmatic process. Strongly-zoned plagioclase with sieve texture also occurs in those rocks. Granodiorite, tonalite and diorite are the most common intrusive rocks found in continental arcs.

== Erosion process ==
The erosion of continental arcs is a part of the main process of global lithosphere circulation. According to relative study, the contribution of continental arc erosion in total continental crust loss is nearly 25%. A process called tectonic erosion happens when friction force during convergence scrapes off huge amount of rocks from the base of continental arcs. Also, precipitation on the continental-arc orogen itself is another erosion process. The debris from the continental arc would deposit in the subduction zone as turbidite. The undergoing subduction forces sediments to accretively add to the accretionary wedge or to subduct into the asthenosphere. Then part of sediments would be recycled through volcanic activities, and thus return to the continental crust, while another part would form new mantle material.

== Distinctions between different arcs ==
The concepts "island arc", "volcanic arc", "oceanic arc" and "continental arc" may be confused:

- Volcanic arcs are made of an arc-shaped chain of volcanoes, the position of which could be continental or mid-ocean.
- Island arcs must be offshore, but they do not necessarily have to be volcanic (e.g. the non-volcanic Hellenic arc).
- Oceanic arcs are volcanic arcs built on oceanic crust, as opposed to continental arcs, which are built on continental crust.
- The composition of oceanic arc crust is different from that of continental arc crust. The oceanic arc crust is more mafic (basaltic/gabbroic) while the continental arc crust is prone to intermediate or felsic composition (andesitic/dioritic).

In some cases, both a continental and oceanic arc can form along the strike of a single subduction zone (e.g. Aleutian Arc).

== Table of continental arcs ==
Continental arc	Country	Trench	Overriding Plate	Subducting plate
Cascade Volcanic Arc	United States and Canada	Cascadia Subduction Zone; no physical oceanic trench can be identified	North American Plate	Juan de Fuca Plate, Explorer Plate, and Gorda Plate
Aleutian Arc	United States	Aleutian Trench	North American Plate	Pacific Plate
Kamchatka	Russia	Kuril–Kamchatka Trench	Eurasian Plate	Pacific Plate
Andean Volcanic Belt	Colombia, Bolivia, Peru, Ecuador, Chile and Argentina	Peru–Chile Trench	South American Plate	Nazca Plate and Antarctic Plate
Central America Volcanic Arc	Guatemala, El Salvador, Honduras, Nicaragua, Costa Rica, Panama	Middle America Trench	Caribbean Plate	Cocos Plate
Gangdese batholith	Tibet, China	No longer existent	Lhasa terrane	Neotethyan ocean

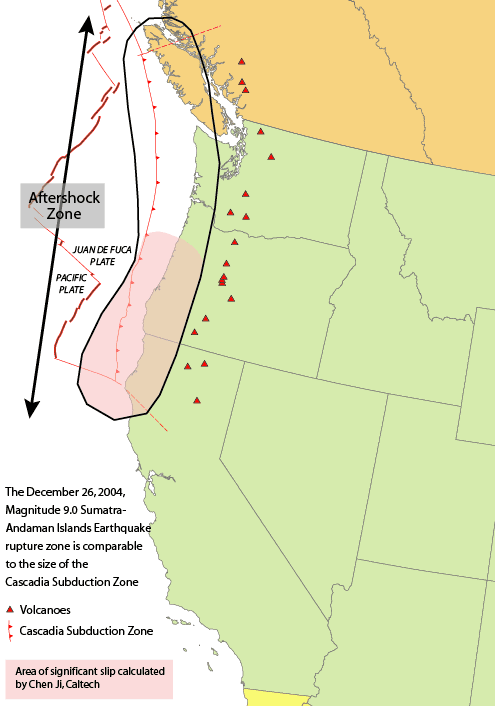
Cascade Volcanic Arc.

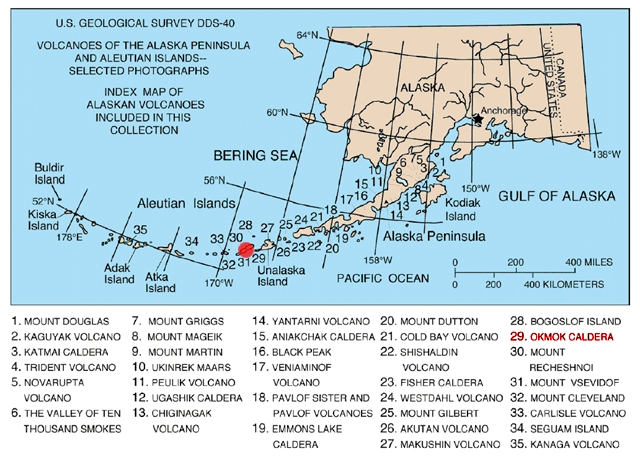
The Aleutian Arc, with both oceanic and continental parts.

Kamchatka Arc, Eastern Russia.

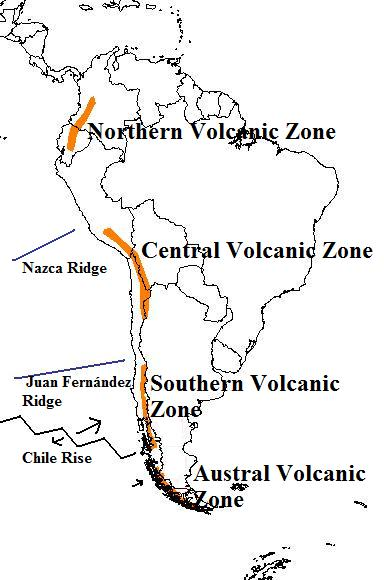
Andean Volcanic Belt

== See also ==
- Volcanic belt
