= Ocean island basalt =

Volcanic rock

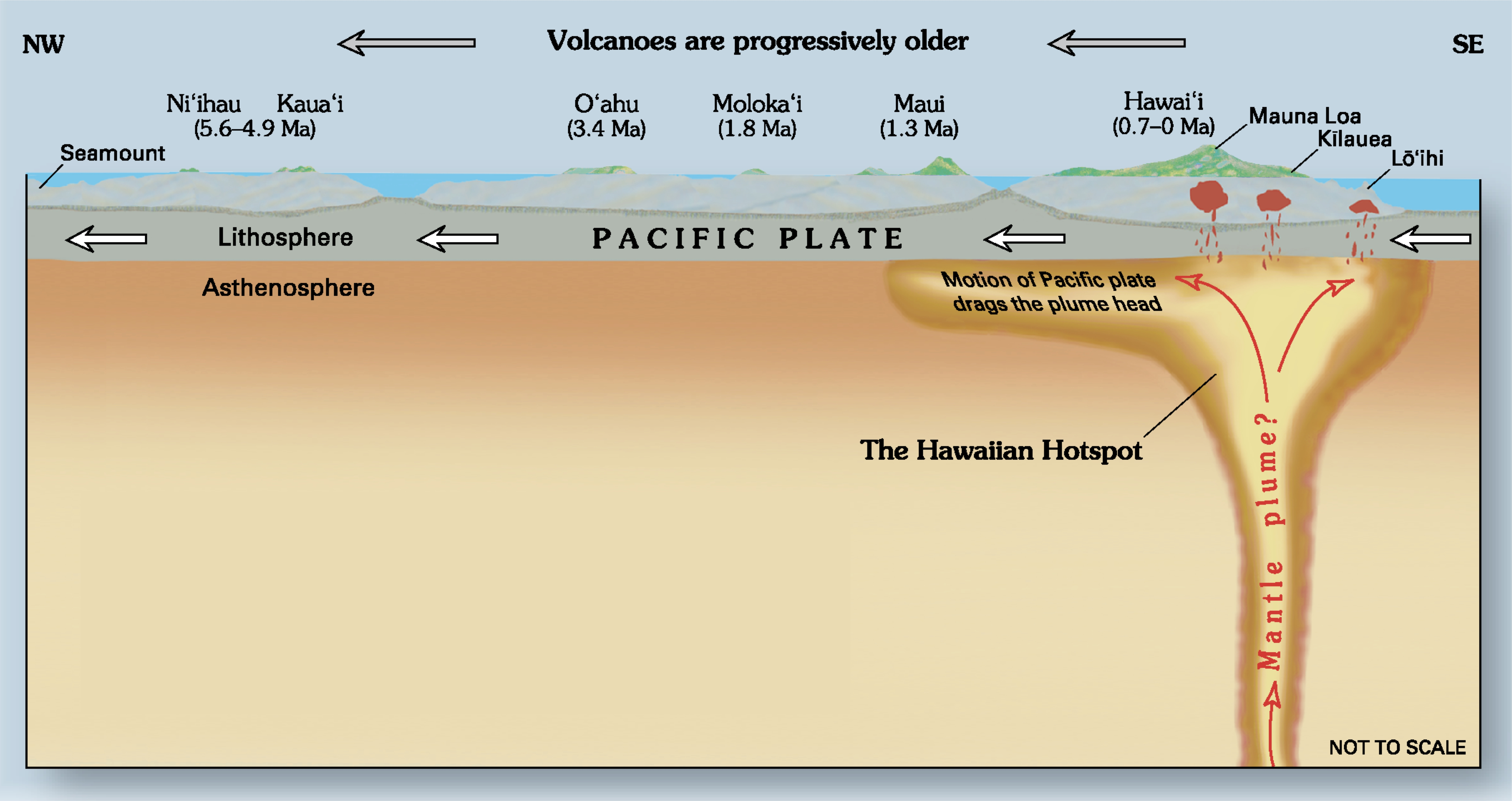
Figure 1. Age-progression of volcanic islands and seamounts at the Hawaii hotspot

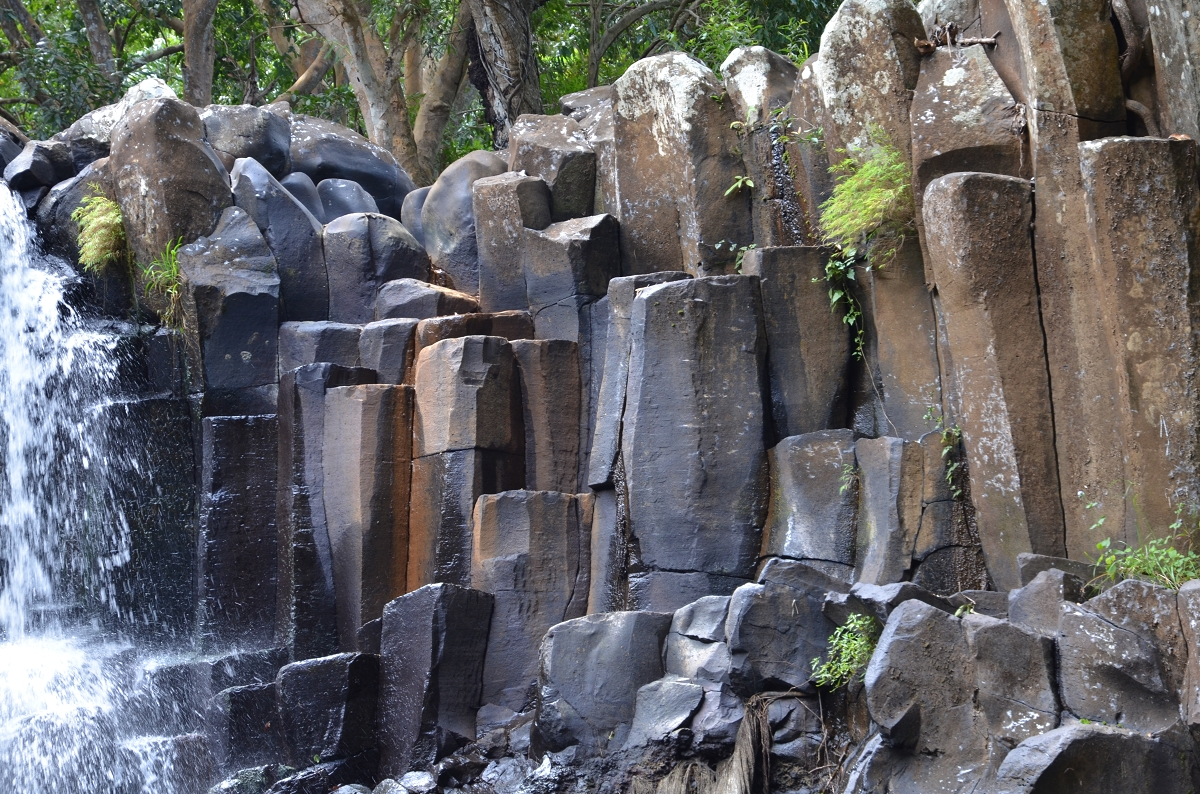
Ocean island basalt formations at Rochester Falls in Mauritius

Ocean island basalt (OIB) is a volcanic rock, usually basaltic in composition, erupted in oceans away from tectonic plate boundaries. Although ocean island basaltic magma is mainly erupted as basalt lava, the basaltic magma is sometimes modified by igneous differentiation to produce a range of other volcanic rock types, for example, rhyolite in Iceland, and phonolite and trachyte at the intraplate volcano Fernando de Noronha. Unlike mid-ocean ridge basalts (MORBs), which erupt at spreading centers (divergent plate boundaries), and volcanic arc lavas, which erupt at subduction zones (convergent plate boundaries), ocean island basalts are the result of intraplate volcanism. However, some ocean island basalt locations coincide with plate boundaries like Iceland, which sits on top of a mid-ocean ridge, and Samoa, which is located near a subduction zone.

In the ocean basins, ocean island basalts form seamounts, and in some cases, enough material is erupted that the rock protrudes from the ocean and forms an island, like at Hawaii, Samoa, and Iceland. Over time, however, thermal subsidence and mass loss via subaerial erosion causes islands to become completely submarine seamounts or guyots. Many ocean island basalts erupt at volcanic hotspots, which are thought to be the surface expressions of melting of thermally buoyant, rising conduits of hot rock in the Earth's mantle, called mantle plumes. Some such hotspot volcanic chains are believed to have started with the formation of large igneous provinces. Mantle plume conduits may drift slowly, but Earth's tectonic plates drift more rapidly relative to mantle plumes. As a result, the relative motion of Earth's tectonic plates over mantle plumes produces age-progressive chains of volcanic islands and seamounts with the youngest, active volcanoes located above the axis of the mantle plume while older, inactive volcanoes are located progressively farther away from the plume conduit (see Figure 1). Hotspot chains can record tens of millions of years of continuous volcanic history; for example, the oldest seamounts in the Hawaiian–Emperor seamount chain are over 80 million years old.

Not all ocean island basalts are the product of mantle plumes. There are thousands of seamounts that are not clearly associated with upwelling mantle plumes, and there are chains of seamounts that are not age progressive. Seamounts that are not clearly linked to a mantle plume indicate that regional mantle composition and tectonic activity may also play important roles in producing intraplate volcanism.

== Mantle sources ==
There are various sources identified for ocean island basalt magma in Earth's mantle but the main component is ancient recycled basaltic oceanic crust which has inherited the trace element and isotopic signatures of a subduction zone dehydration process, with enrichment in high field strength elements. These mantle sources are inferred from differences in radiogenic isotope ratios that magmas inherit from their source rock. Sources have been defined from a combined analysis of strontium (Sr), neodymium (Nd) and lead (Pb) isotopes but it is now possible to classify usefully and more conveniently on high field strength trace elements alone such as barium (Ba), caesium (Ce), rubidium (Rb), niobium (Nb) and terbium (Tb is chosen as proportion about constant in all OIB). (Note: It is premature to be sure that this new clean means of classification will also be useful for intraplate continental basalts and FOZO appears to still need Helium-3 determination) :

Name	Full Name	Source	Trace element composition
Enriched sources
EM1 (EMI)	Enriched Mantle 1	Significant contamination with continental crust, usually lower crust. Probably mantle contaminated with material derived from subducted pelagic sediments. An alternative explanation is that this source derives from the sub-continental lithosphere which could also be contaminated by subducted pelagic sediments.	Moderate Nb, Ce, Ba, La, Nb. Enrichment of Ba
EM2 (EMII)	Enriched Mantle 2	Significant contamination with continental crust, usually upper crust. Likely mantle contaminated with material derived from the recycling (Note: Subduction, subduction erosion etc.) of terrigenous sediments from the continental crust into the mantle.	Less enriched in Nb, Ba, La, and Ce compared to EMI or HIMU but relative enrichment Ba c.f. HIMU or DMM
HIMU	High U/Pb ratio	Negligible crustal contamination. Likely derived from subducted oceanic crust that has not been homogenized with the rest of the mantle. The lack of homogenization could be indebted to the accumulation of subducted oceanic crust in large-scale “megaliths” at the 670 km seismic discontinuity or near the core–mantle boundary.	Low Ba, high Ce and La
Depleted sources
PREMA	Prevalent Mantle	Possible formed by mixing of all the other mantle sources or a source formed early in Earth's history.	
DMM	Depleted MORB Mantle	Has mid-oceanic ridge basalt (MORB) characteristics with low ^{87}Sr/^{86}Sr and high ^{143}Nd/^{144}Nd and εHf as compared to MORB	Low Ba, high to moderate Ce/Rb (i.e. low Rb) and low La
FOZO	Focus Zone	A source associated with mantle plumes. It is of intermediate composition between DMM and HIMU. The name Focus Zone derives from the apparent fanning out of compositions from this zone when displaying isotope composition data on tetrahedron chart. FOZO contains high contents of Helium-3. The FOZO source is associated with deep mantle plumes. FOZO has been proposed to be either the plume material that rises from the core–mantle boundary or material that becomes attached to the plume as a sheet as the plume it rises from the core–mantle boundary.	

=== Isotope geochemistry ===
The geochemistry of ocean island basalts is useful for studying the chemical and physical structure of Earth's mantle. Some mantle plumes that feed hotspot volcanism lavas are thought to originate as deep as the core–mantle boundary (~2900 km deep). The composition of the ocean island basalts at hotspots provides a window into the composition of mantle domains in the plume conduit that melted to yield the basalts, thus providing clues as to how and when different reservoirs in the mantle formed.

Early conceptual models for the geochemical structure of the mantle argued that the mantle was split into two reservoirs: the upper mantle and the lower mantle. The upper mantle was thought to be geochemically depleted due to melt extraction which formed Earth's continents. The lower mantle was thought to be homogenous and “primitive”. (Primitive, in this case, refers to silicate material that represents the building blocks of the planet that has not been modified by melt extraction, or mixed with subducted materials, since Earth's accretion and core formation.) Seismic tomography showed subducted slabs passing through the upper mantle and entering the lower mantle, which indicates that the lower mantle cannot be isolated. Additionally, the isotopic heterogeneity observed in plume-derived ocean island basalts argues against a homogenous lower mantle. Heavy, radiogenic isotopes are a particularly useful tool for studying the composition of mantle sources because isotopic ratios are not sensitive to mantle melting. According tradition subclassification used Sr-Nd-Pb-Hf-He isotopic ratios. This means that the heavy radiogenic isotopic ratio of a melt, which upwells and becomes a volcanic rock on the surface of the Earth, reflects the isotopic ratio of the mantle source at the time of melting. The best studied heavy radiogenic isotope systems in ocean island basalts are ^{87}Sr/^{86}Sr, ^{143}Nd/^{144}Nd, ^{206}Pb/^{204}Pb, ^{207}Pb/^{204}Pb, ^{208}Pb/^{204}Pb, ^{176}Hf/^{177}Hf and, more recently, ^{187}Os/^{188}Os. In each of these systems, a radioactive parent isotope with a long half-life (i.e., longer than 704 million years) decays to a “radiogenic” daughter isotope. Changes in the parent/daughter ratio by, for example, mantle melting, result in changes in the radiogenic isotopic ratios. Thus, these radiogenic isotopic systems are sensitive to the timing, and degree, of parent/daughter the changed (or fractionated) parent daughter ratio, which then informs the process(es) responsible for generating observed radiogenic isotopic heterogeneity in ocean island basalts. In mantle geochemistry, any composition with relatively low ^{87}Sr/^{86}Sr, and high ^{143}Nd/^{144}Nd and ^{176}Hf/^{177}Hf, is a referred to as “geochemically depleted”. High ^{87}Sr/^{86}Sr, and low ^{143}Nd/^{144}Nd and ^{176}Hf/^{177}Hf, is referred to as “geochemically enriched”. Relatively low isotopic ratios of Pb in mantle-derived rocks are described as unradiogenic; relatively high ratios are described as radiogenic.

These isotopic systems have provided evidence for a heterogenous lower mantle. There are several distinct “mantle domains” or endmembers that appear in the ocean island basalt record. When plotted in multi-isotope space, ocean island basalts tend to form arrays trending from a central composition out to an endmember with an extreme composition. The depleted mantle, or DM, is one endmember, and is defined by low ^{87}Sr/^{86}Sr, ^{206}Pb/^{204}Pb, ^{207}Pb/^{204}Pb, ^{208}Pb/^{204}Pb, and high ^{143}Nd/^{144}Nd and ^{176}Hf/^{177}Hf. The DM is therefore geochemically depleted, and relatively unradiogenic. Mid-ocean ridges passively sample the upper mantle and MORBs are typically geochemically depleted, and therefore it is widely accepted that the upper mantle is composed mostly of depleted mantle. Thus, the term depleted MORB mantle (DMM) is often used to describe the upper mantle that sources mid-ocean ridge volcanism. Ocean island basalts also sample geochemically depleted mantle domains. In fact, most ocean island basalts are geochemically depleted, and <10% of ocean island basalts have lavas that extend to geochemically enriched (i.e., ^{143}Nd/^{144}Nd lower than the Earth's building blocks) compositions.

There are two geochemically enriched domains, named enriched mantle 1 (EM1), and enriched mantle 2 (EM2). Though broadly similar, there are some important distinctions between EM1 and EM2. EM1 has unradiogenic ^{206}Pb/^{204}Pb, moderately high ^{87}Sr/^{86}Sr, and extends to lower ^{143}Nd/^{144}Nd and ^{176}Hf/^{177}Hf than EM2. Pitcairn, Kerguelen-Heard, and Tristan-Gough are the type localities of EM1. EM2 is defined by higher ^{87}Sr/^{86}Sr than EM1, and higher ^{143}Nd/^{144}Nd and ^{176}Hf/^{177}Hf at a given ^{87}Sr/^{86}Sr value, and intermediate ^{206}Pb/^{204}Pb. Samoa and Society are the archetypal EM2 localities.

Another distinct mantle domain is the HIMU mantle. In isotope geochemistry, the Greek letter μ (or mu) is used to describe the ^{238}U/^{204}Pb, such that ‘high μ’ (abbreviated HIMU) describes a high ^{238}U/^{204}Pb ratio. Over time, as ^{238}U decays to ^{206}Pb, HIMU Earth materials develop particularly radiogenic (high) ^{206}Pb/^{204}Pb. If an Earth material has elevated ^{238}U/^{204}Pb (HIMU), then it will also have elevated ^{235}U/^{204}Pb, and therefore will produce radiogenic Pb compositions for both the ^{206}Pb/^{204}Pb and ^{207}Pb/^{204}Pb isotopic systems (^{238}U decays ^{206}Pb, ^{235}U decays to ^{207}Pb). Similarly, Earth materials with high U/Pb also tend to have high Th/Pb, and thus evolve to have high ^{208}Pb/^{204}Pb (^{232}Th decays to ^{208}Pb). Ocean island basalts with highly radiogenic ^{206}Pb/^{204}Pb, ^{207}Pb/^{204}Pb, ^{208}Pb/^{204}Pb are the products of HIMU mantle domains. St. Helena, and several islands in the Cook-Austral volcanic lineament (e.g., Mangaia) are the type localities for HIMU ocean island basalts.

The final mantle domain discussed here is the common composition that ocean island basalts trend toward in radiogenic isotopic multi-space. This is also most prevalent mantle source in ocean island basalts, and has intermediate to geochemically depleted ^{87}Sr/^{86}Sr, ^{143}Nd/^{144}Nd, and ^{176}Hf/^{177}Hf, as well as intermediate ^{206}Pb/^{204}Pb, ^{207}Pb/^{204}Pb, ^{208}Pb/^{204}Pb. This central mantle domain has several names, each with slightly different implications. PREMA, or “Prevalent Mantle” was the first term coined by Zindler and Hart (1986) to describe the most common composition sampled by ocean island basalts. Hart et al. (1992) later named the location of the intersection of ocean island basalt compositions in radiogenic isotopic multi-space as the “Focus Zone”, or FOZO. Farley et al. (1992) in the same year described a high ^{3}He/^{4}He (a primitive geochemical signature) component in plumes as the “Primitive Helium Mantle”, or PHEM. Finally, Hanan and Graham (1996) used the term “C” (for common component) to describe a common mixing component in mantle derived rocks.

The presence of a particular mantle domain in ocean island basalts from two hotspots, signaled by a particular radiogenic isotopic composition, does not necessarily indicate that mantle plumes with similar isotopic compositions are sourced from the same physical reservoir in the deep mantle. Instead, mantle domains with similar radiogenic isotopic compositions sampled at different hotspot localities are thought to share similar geologic histories. For example, the EM2 hotspots of Samoa and Society are both thought to have a mantle source that contains recycled upper continental crust, an idea that is supported by stable isotope observations, including δ^{18}O and δ^{7}Li. The isotopic similarities do not imply that Samoa and Society have the same physical mantle source, as evidenced by their slightly distinct arrays in radiogenic isotopic multi-space. Thus, hotspots that are categorized as “EM1”, “EM2”, “HIMU”, or “FOZO”, may each sample physically distinct, but compositionally similar, portions of the mantle. Furthermore, some hotspot chains host lavas with wide range of isotopic compositions so that the plume source seems to either sample multiple domains which can be sampled at different times in the volcanic evolution of a hotspot.

Isotopic systems help to deconvolve the geologic processes that contributed to, and in some cases the timing of, the formation of these mantle domains. Some important examples include the presence of crustal fingerprints in enriched mantle sources that indicate that material from Earth's continents and oceans can be subducted into the mantle and brought back up to the surface in buoyantly rising mantle plumes. Sulfur isotopic analyses have shown mass-independent-fractionation (MIF) in the sulfur isotopes in some plume-derived lavas. MIF of sulfur isotopes is a phenomenon that occurred in Earth's atmosphere only before the Great Oxidation Event ~2.3 Ga. The presence of recycled material with MIF signatures indicates that some of the recycled material brought is older than 2.3 Ga, formed prior to the Great Oxidation Event and has resurfaced via mantle plume volcanism. Noble gas isotopic systems, such as ^{3}He/^{4}He, ^{20}Ne/^{22}Ne, and ^{129}Xe/^{130}Xe, have been used to demonstrate that parts of the lower mantle are relatively less degassed and have not been homogenized despite billions of years of mantle convective mixing. Some large, hot mantle plumes have anomalously high ^{3}He/^{4}He. Since ^{4}He is being constantly produced within the Earth via alpha decay (of ^{235,238}U, ^{232}Th, and ^{147}Sm), but ^{3}He is not being generated in appreciable quantities in the deep Earth, the ratio of ^{3}He to ^{4}He is decreasing in the interior of the Earth over time. The early Solar System began with high ^{3}He/^{4}He and therefore the Earth first accreted with high ^{3}He/^{4}He. Thus, in plume-derived lavas, high ^{3}He/^{4}He is an “ancient” geochemical signature that indicates the existence of a well-preserved helium reservoir in the deep mantle. The timing of the formation of this reservoir is constrained by observed anomalies of ^{129}Xe/^{130}Xe in ocean islands basalts, because ^{129}Xe was only produced by decay of ^{129}I during the first ~100 My of Earth's history. Together, high ^{3}He/^{4}He and ^{129}Xe/^{130}Xe indicate a relatively less degassed, primitive noble gas domain that has been relatively well preserved since the early Hadean.
