= Polybaric melting =

Mode of origin of basaltic magma

In basalt petrogenesis polybaric melting implies that liquids are incrementally separated from residues across a range of pressures and subsequently mix and move through the mantle without equilibrating with surrounding mantle minerals. This model was developed to better approximate basalt petrogenesis in modeling and experiments. It usually involves polybaric near-fractional melting (e.g., constant intergranular porosity in the rock during melting and/or reactive porous flow in melt extraction) along an adiabatic path.

In practice, petrologic models employ advanced forms of the polybaric concept for greater physical plausibility. Such models incorporate interconnected porosity to facilitate buoyant flow of liquids from lherzolitic or harzburgitic assemblages, such as replacive dunite formation in migration channels. The porosity has to consist of at least two or a continuum of size scales to account for U-series disequilibria and major/trace element chemistry of abyssal peridotites.

The realization that polybaric near-fractional melting may be the dominant form of basalt petrogenesis was a consequence of difficulties with a simpler paradigm involving only a chemically distinct primary melt, in equilibrium with residual mantle minerals, undergoing fractionation (and transportation) to yield basaltic and mid-ocean ridge basalt (MORB) lava. The assumption of a unique primary melt led to the expectation that chemical and mineral characterization of primitive glasses associated with a basalt would constrain the residual mantle mineral assemblage, temperature, and pressure of the (presumed) primary melt. However, such "inverse" modeling as well as "forward" peridotite melting experiments failed to fully constrain underlying processes, necessitating the use of polybaric near-fractional melting.

It is possible to incorporate polybaric near-fractional melting considerations into predictive algorithms such as pMELTS and MAGPOX.
