= Lithophile =

Type of micro-organisms l

Lithophiles are micro-organisms that can live within the pore interstices of sedimentary and even fractured igneous rocks to depths of several kilometers.

Some are known to live on surface rocks, and make use of photosynthesis for energy.

Those that live in deeper rocks cannot use photosynthesis to gather energy, but instead extract energy from minerals around them. They live in cracks in the rock where water seeps down. The water contains dissolved carbon dioxide (CO_{2}) which the organisms use for their carbon needs. They have been detected in rocks down to depths of nearly three km, where the temperature is approximately 75 °C.

Terrestrial lithophiles can be found in canyons primarily composed of granite, an igneous rock, and soils saturated with fractured rock. Organisms from the genus Elliptochloris, a subaerial photosynthetic green algae, demonstrate lithophilic preferences through colonization in granite cracks and in proximity to terrestrial lichens. Lithophilic lichens from the genus Collema form tight symbiotic relationships between fungi and photosynthetic algae such as Elliptochloris in order to produce necessary saturated fatty acid secondary metabolites. Lithophilic algal species colonizing fractured rock outcroppings individually exhibit coccal morphological shape while aggregating into an elliptical or globular arrangement during adulthood.

Lithobiontic ecological niches further classify lithophiles into sub-categories determined by their spatial niche specificity. The term, lithic, refers to an association with rock and can be further explained by the term, lithobiontic, regarded as organisms living both on, and within rock surfaces. Sub-surface rock organisms, endoliths, primarily exhibit niche preference within fissures, cavities, or tunnels of various rocks. While many endoliths degrade and effectively excavate the available carbonate rock surface, many are preyed upon by select gastropod, and echinoderm species. This habitat preference can be further threatened by suspension feeding organisms searching for acquired shelter.
