= Rochester Falls =

Waterfall in Mauritius

Coordinates: 20°30′09″S 57°31′01″E

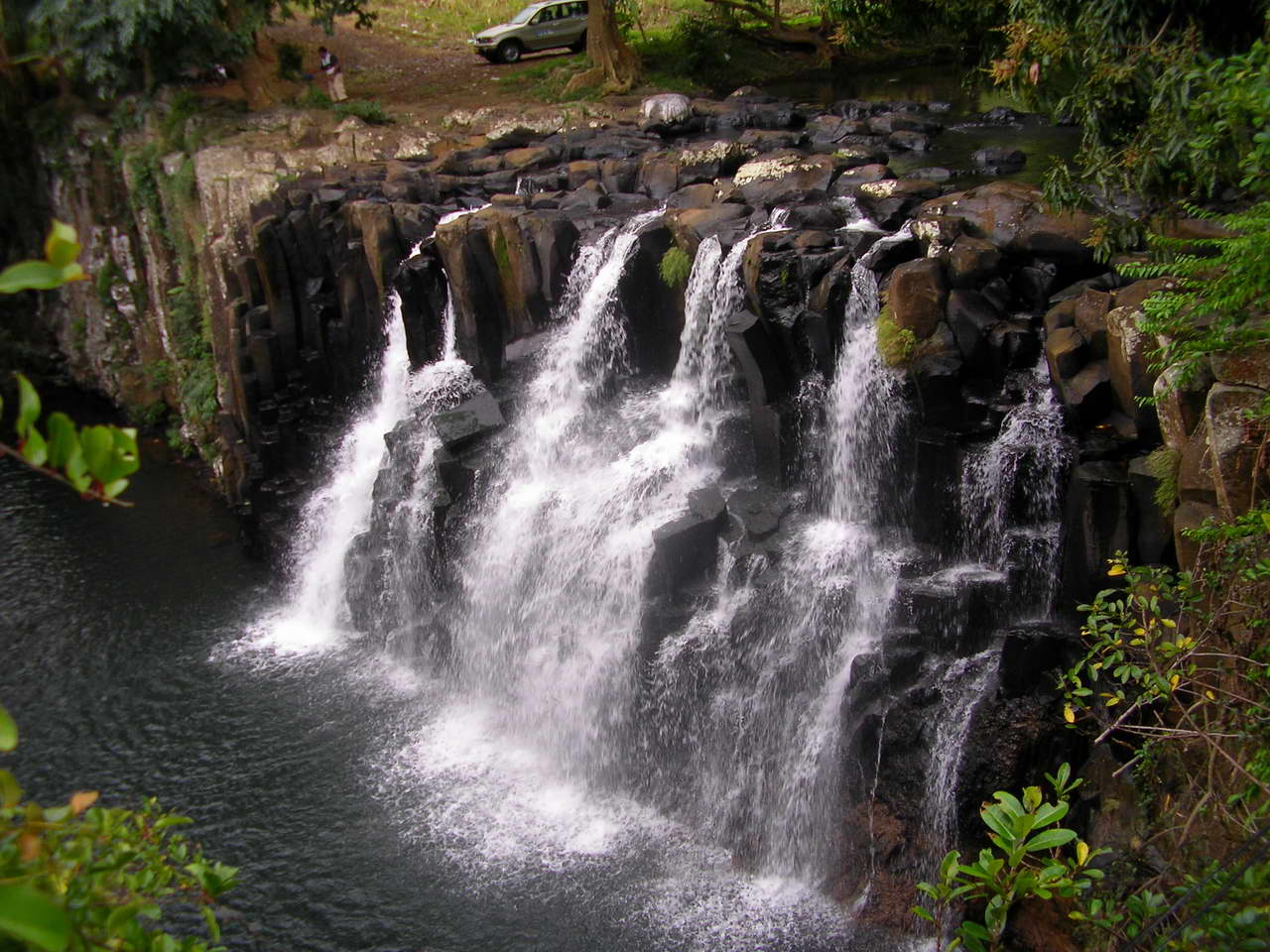
Rochester Falls

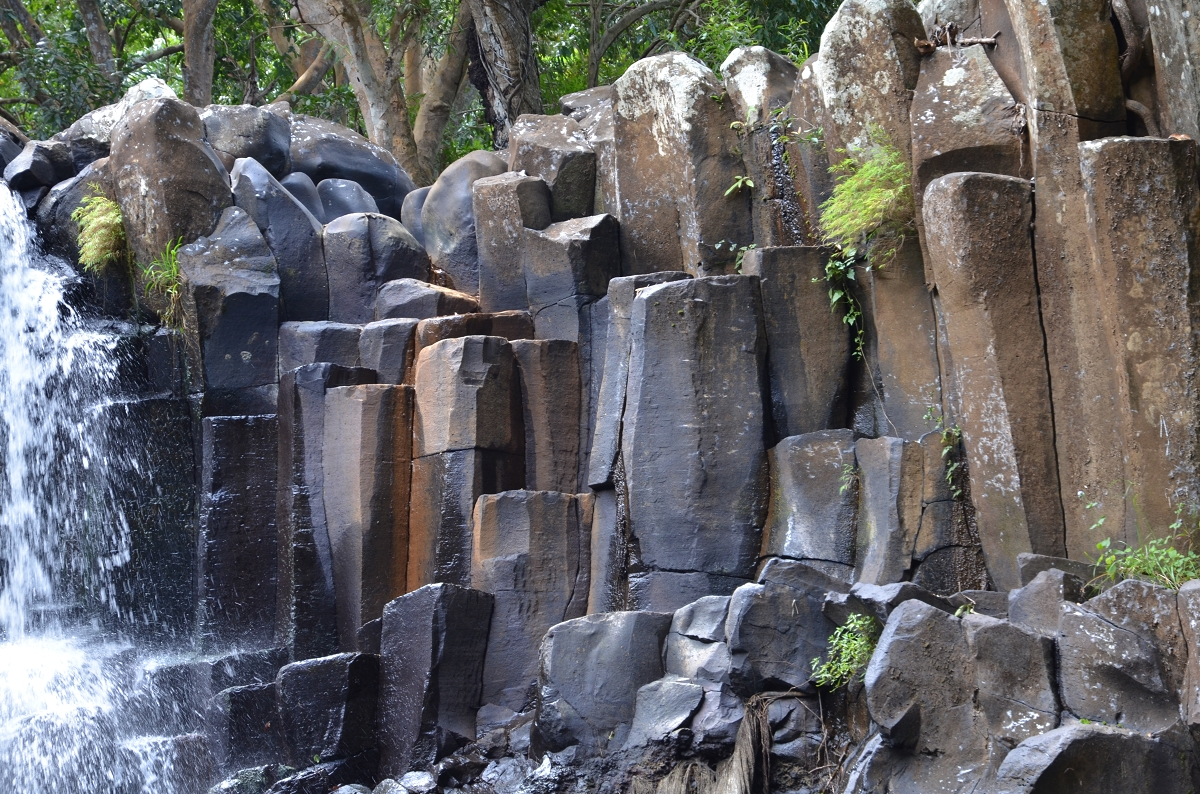
Basalt columns

Rochester Falls is a waterfall situated in the Savanne district of Mauritius. Highly popular for its rectangular flank rocks, the fall is one of the most popular tourist attractions and the widest waterfall in Mauritius.

The waterfall is located on the Savanne River at an elevation of 152 meters above sea level, approximately 2.5 km from Souillac (the capital of the Savanne district), and it tumbles from a height of about 10 m (33 ft).

== View ==
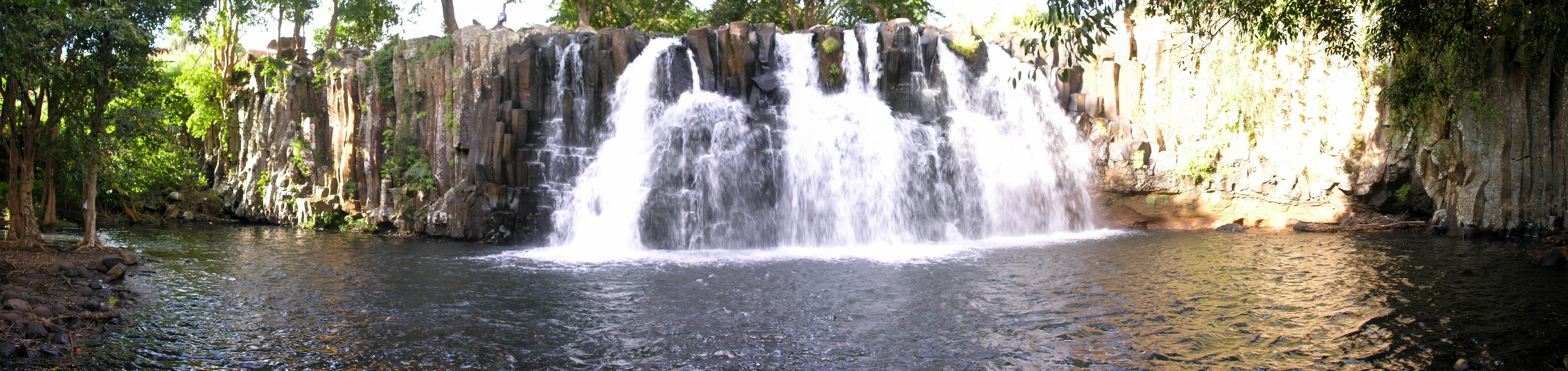
