= Subduction erosion =

Tectonic erosion or subduction erosion is the loss of crust from an overriding tectonic plate due to subduction. Two types of tectonic erosion exist: frontal erosion at the outer margin of a plate and basal erosion at the base of the plate's crust. Basal erosion causes a thinning of the overriding plate. When frontal tectonic erosion consumes a crustal block at the outer margin it may induce a domino effect on upper crustal tectonics causing the remaining blocks to fault and tilt to fill the “gap” left by the consumed block. Subduction erosion is believed to be enhanced by high convergence rates and low sediment supply to the trench.

Before the Neoproterozoic, subduction erosion rates were probably higher than at present due to higher convergence rates. A scarcity of blueschists from this time seems to support this view. However, this assertion is arguably wrong because the earliest oceanic crust would have contained more magnesium than today's crust and, therefore, would have formed greenschist-like rocks at blueschist facies.

The following features and processes have been associated with subduction erosion:

- Extensional tectonics: Tectonic erosion is believed be a widespread phenomenon in northern Chile with the normal faulting around Mejillones Peninsula attributed to an extensional domino effect caused by the consumption of a lithospheric block.
- Regional subsidence and transgression: The Miocene transgression of southern Chile has been suggested to have been caused by basal tectonic erosion. Subduction erosion does not explain the Miocene transgression further inland in Patagonia.
- Magmatic belt migration: Concurrent with the Andean orogeny the eastward migration of the magmatic belts in Chile from the Late Cretaceous onward is thought to be caused by subduction erosion.

== See also ==
- Crustal recycling
- Delamination
