= East Mata =

Seamount in the Pacific Ocean

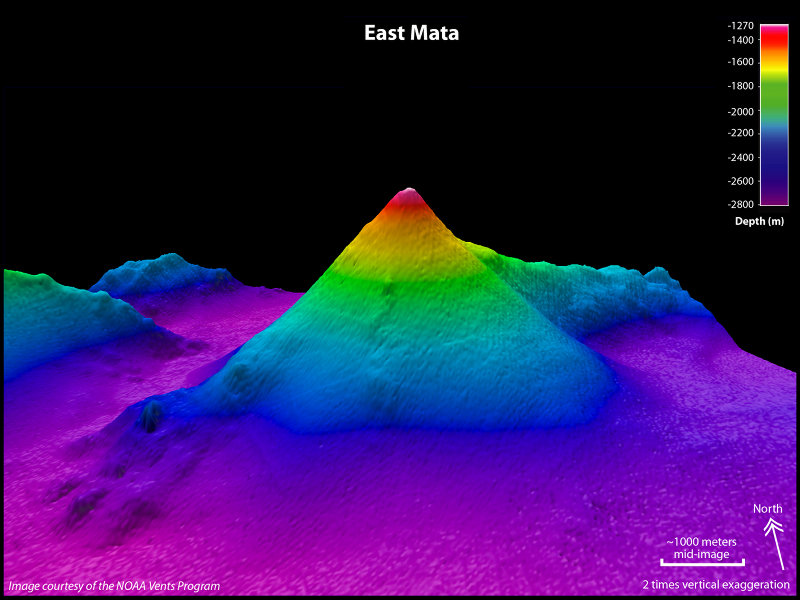
- Bathymetry map of East Mata with 2x vertical exaggeration
- Summit depth: −1,286 m (−4,219 ft)
- Height: ~2,900 m (9,514 ft)

Location
- Group: Mata volcanic group
- Range: Tofua volcanic arc
- Coordinates: 15°06′07″S 173°40′37″W
- Country: Tonga

Geology
- Type: Fissure vent
- Last activity: Unknown

History
- Discovery date: 2008

East Mata is an hydrothermally active submarine volcano located in the northeastern Lau Basin, right beside the better known West Mata volcano, which effusively erupted in 2009. It is located roughly 95 km (59 mi) north of Hihifo, Tonga. It can be found on the northern portion of the Tonga-Kermadec volcanic arc which extends from North Island of New Zealand all the way to Samoa. The volcano was discovered along with West Mata and other volcanoes in 2008 by a team of NOAA scientists when they visited the region in a research vessel.

== Geography ==
Map of volcanoes in the Mata group, northeastern Lau Basin.

The volcano can be found about 200 km (124 mi) southwest of Samoa and north of a more active volcano, Curacoa which had a significant eruption in 1973.

In the surroundings of the volcano can be found the Mata volcanic group which consists of multiple volcanic structures which vary in activity including West Mata, Northern Matas, Tafu-Maka and Niuatahi.

=== Structure ===
In terms of morphology, East Mata is very similar to West Mata, both in terms of shape and size, considering they both are rift zones that have taken a similar process to form. Rift zones form by the spreading of the lithosphere as the magma upwells towards the surface.

== Geologic setting ==
East Mata including the Mata group can be found in the Lau Basin, or more specifically the northeastern (NE) Lau Basin. The NE Lau Basin is bordered by multiple rift zones or spreading centres which are hydrothermally active like the NE Lau Spreading Center (NELSC), the Mangatolu Triple Junction (MTJ) and the Fonualei Rift Spreading Center (FRSC) from north to south, respectively. These hydrothermal and volcanic systems are caused by the rollback of the Tonga Trench which has also created the back-arc Lau Basin. This rollback created an area of spreading centers and rift zones with active hydrothermal vents.

== Hydrothermal activity ==
Recent papers suggest that East Mata is hydrothermally active however it usually generates low-temperature and weak venting.

== See also ==
- List of volcanoes in Tonga

== Sources ==
- Embley, R. W.; Rubin, K. H. (2018). "Extensive young silicic volcanism produces large deep submarine lava flows in the NE Lau Basin". Bulletin of Volcanology. 80 (4): 0–23. Bibcode:2018BVol...80...36E. doi:10.1007/s00445-018-1211-7. S2CID 135093528.
- Walker, S. L.; Baker, E. T.; Lupton, J. E.; Resing, J. A. (2019). "Patterns of Fine Ash Dispersal Related to Volcanic Activity at West Mata Volcano, NE Lau Basin". Frontiers in Marine Science. 6: 0–15. doi:10.3389/fmars.2019.00593.
- Embley, R. W.; Merle, S. G.; Baker, E. T.; Rubin, K. H.; Lupton, J. E.; Resing, J. A.; Dziak, R. P.; Lilley, M. D.; Chadwick Jr., W. W.; Shank, T.; Greene, R.; Walker, S. L.; Haxel, J.; Olson, E.; Baumberger, T. (2014). "Eruptive modes and hiatus of volcanism at West Mata seamount, NE Lau basin: 1996–2012". Geochemistry, Geophysics, Geosystems. 15 (10): 4093–4115. Bibcode:2014GGG....15.4093E. doi:10.1002/2014GC005387. hdl:1912/7011. S2CID 67825780.
