= Submarine eruption =

Underwater volcanic eruption

Scheme of a submarine eruption. 1) Water vapor cloud; 2) Water; 3) Stratum; 4) Lava flow; 5) Magma conduit; 6) Magma chamber; 7) Dike; 8) Pillow lava

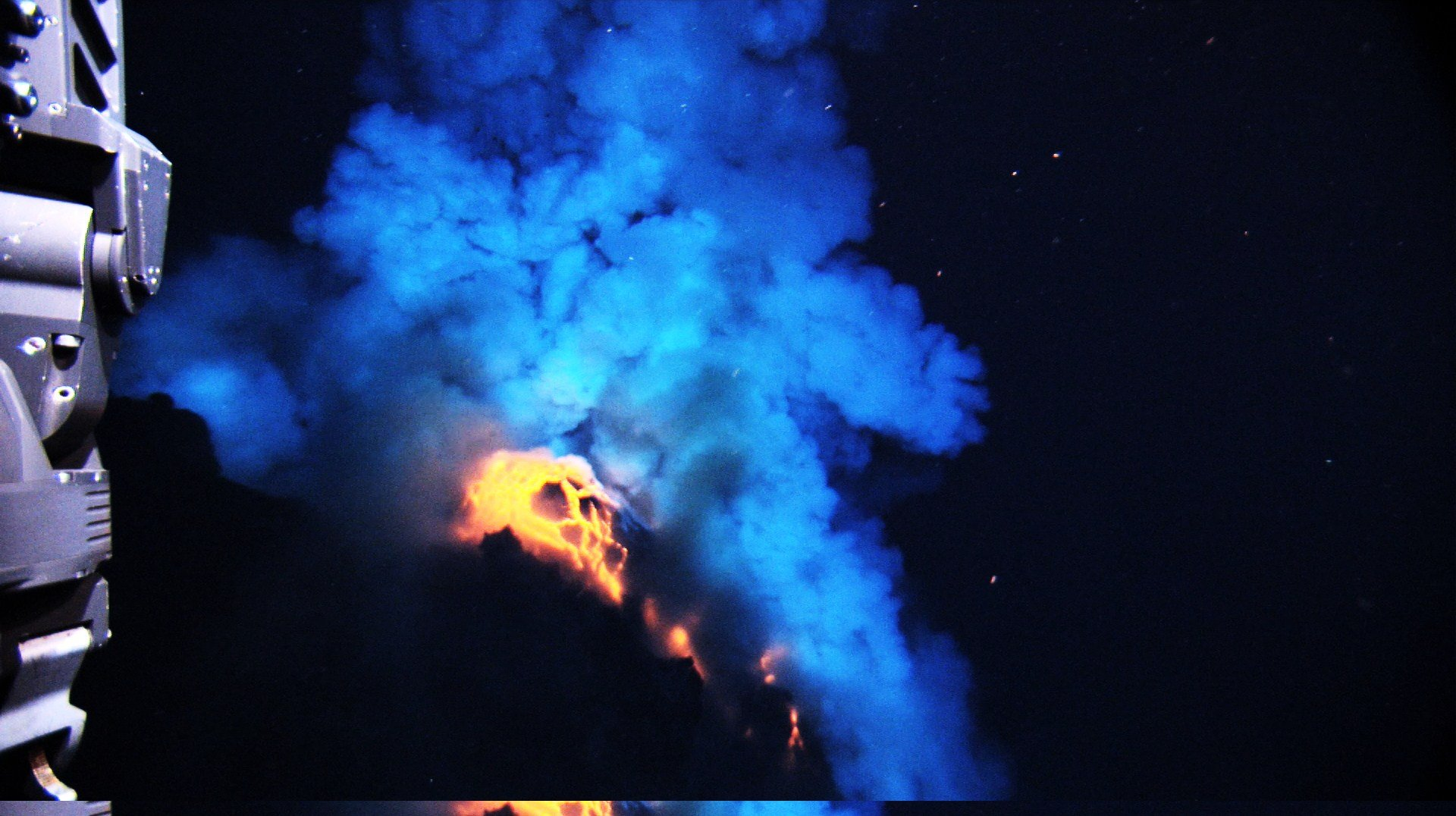
Submarine eruption at West Mata

Submarine eruptions are volcano eruptions which take place beneath the surface of water. These occur at constructive margins, subduction zones, and within tectonic plates due to hotspots. This eruption style is far more prevalent than subaerial activity. For example, it is believed that 70 to 80% of the Earth's magma output takes place at mid-ocean ridges.

== Detection ==
Submarine eruption at Fukutoku-Okanoba

Submarine eruptions are less studied than subaerial volcanoes due to their inaccessibility. Developments in technology mean that submarine volcanoes can now be studied in greater detail. Despite this progress, understanding is still limited. Mid ocean ridges for example are the most active volcanic systems on Earth but roughly only 5% of their length has been studied in detail.

Initial knowledge of these eruptions came from volcanic rocks being recovered from the ocean floor when repairs were made to the Transatlantic telegraph cable in the 1800s. More recently a variety of techniques have been used to study these eruptions with significant developments being made since 1990. These include the use of remote controlled submersibles which can conduct surveys of the ocean floor. The use of hydrophone networks allows volcanic eruptions to be detected. Submersibles can be sent out in response to this to record the result of the eruption. Other tools have included seismic signals, acoustic waves and high resolution UAV multibeam mapping.

Increasingly, eruptions at greater depths can be observed. For example, an explosive eruption at West Mata in Lau Basin at a depth of 1200 m was studied using submersibles.

== Controls on eruptive style ==
There is much variation in the style of submarine eruptions. This changes with a number of variables including magma viscosity, water depth, effusion rate and volatile content. Many studies highlight the effects of pressure which increases with depth. It is believed that increased pressure restricts the release of volatile gases, resulting in effusive eruptions. This is not to say that explosive eruptions do not occur at depth, just that a higher volatile content is required. It has been estimated that at 500 m explosive activity associated with basalts is suppressed, while depths greater than 2300 m would be sufficient to prevent the majority of explosive activity from rhyolite lava.

== Shallow water eruptions ==
At shallow depths it is common for submarine eruptions to be explosive due to the reaction between volatiles in the magma and water which generates a significant quantity of steam. These eruptions described as Surtseyan are characterised by large quantities of steam and gas and creating large amounts of pumice. This activity has occurred in many locations. An example is Fukuto-Okanoba near Japan. This activity has been observed for almost a century and causes discoloured water, jets of steam and ash, and pumice is found floating in the surrounding water.

Shallow eruptions can lead to the creation of islands. The most well known is Surtsey in Iceland (1963-1967). Similar island building activity occurs frequently but these are often short lived.

Volatile content is also significant. Magma being transported into the ocean through tunnels may see gases being exsolved before reaching the water and so the eruption is effusive. This has been seen in Hawaii.

== Deep water eruption ==
With increased depth there is greater pressure and it is believed that this results in effusive eruptions. There is a variety of evidence, however, which suggests that explosive, pyroclastic activity can occur at depth. This includes observations of Pele's hair and evidence of caldera collapse. This activity is thought to be common at subduction zones due to recycling of the lithosphere. It is not exclusive to these plate margins, occurring at hotspots and ocean ridges. An example is Kamaʻehuakanaloa (formerly Loihi) near Hawaii where both effusive and explosive activity occurs at 2000 m depth.

Two formations associated with submarine eruptions are seamounts and pillow lavas. Pillow lavas are created due to rapid cooling of lava which forms a skin. As more magma is forced into this the skin expands creating a lobe. When this fractures then lava seeps through the gap exposing hot lava to the water and again a skin forms over this: this process is then repeated.

== See also ==
- Submarine volcano
