= Amalda raoulensis =

Scientific classification
- Kingdom: Animalia
- Phylum: Mollusca
- Class: Gastropoda
- Subclass: Caenogastropoda
- Order: Neogastropoda
- Family: Ancillariidae
- Genus: Amalda
- Species: A. raoulensis

Binomial name
- Amalda raoulensis (Powell, 1967)

Species of gastropod

Amalda raoulensis is a species of sea snail, a marine gastropod mollusk in the family Ancillariidae.

== Description ==
This species attains a size of 56 mm.

== Distribution ==
Dredged in very deep water from Kermadec Islands to Lau–Colville Ridge, north of North Island, New Zealand.
