= Niuatahi =

Submarine volcano in Tonga

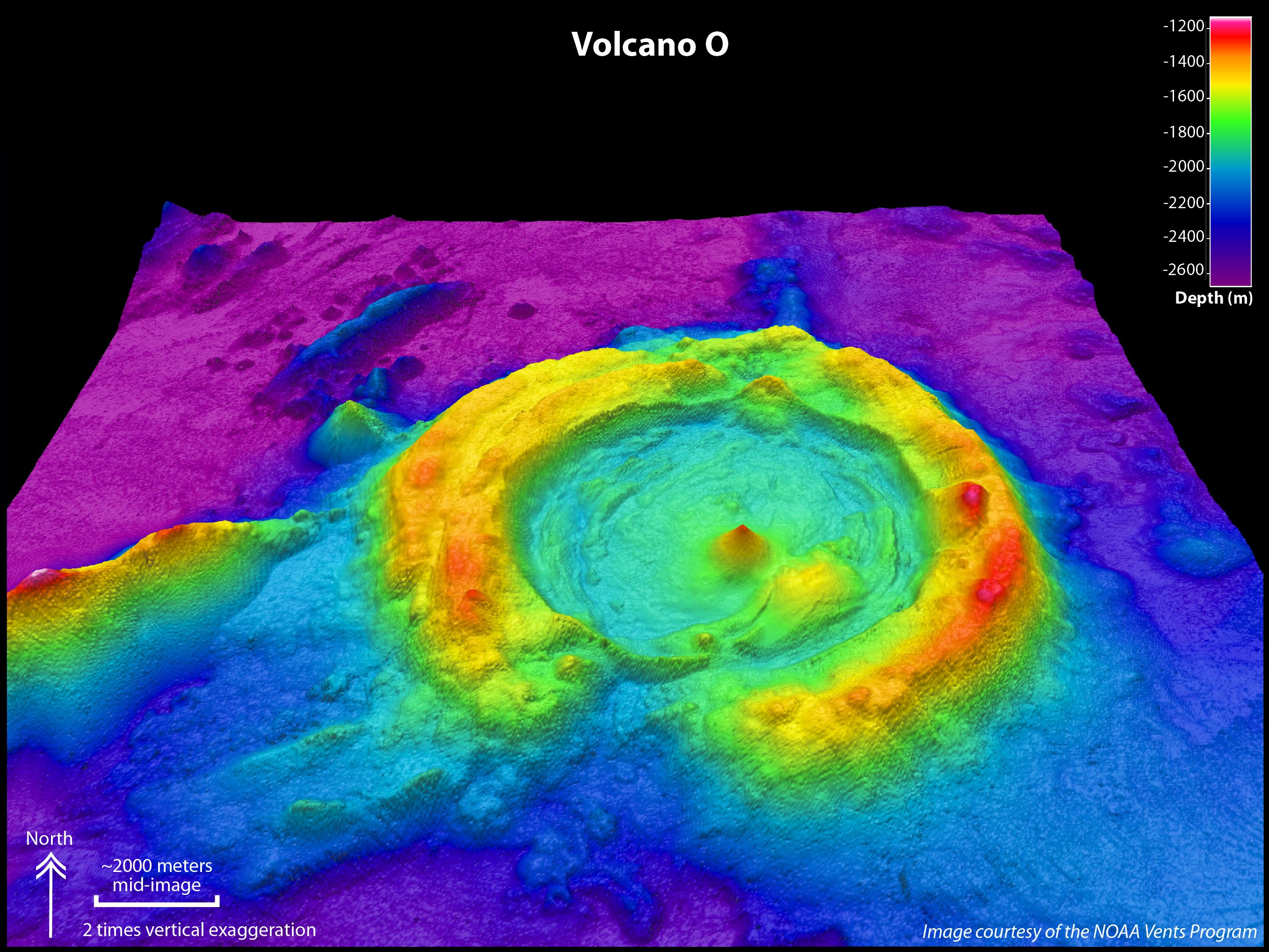
- Bathymetry map of Niuatahi with 2 times vertical exaggeration
- Summit depth: −1,270 m (−4,167 ft)

Location
- Group: Northeast Lau Basin volcanoes
- Range: Tofua volcanic arc
- Coordinates: 15°22′44″S 174°00′10″W
- Country: Tonga

Geology
- Type: Caldera
- Last activity: Unknown

Niuatahi or Volcano O is a submarine volcano located in the far northern territory of Tonga. Since the cone in the middle is named Motutahi, the volcano is sometimes referred to as Niuatahi-Motutahi. Despite not having any record of any eruption, Niuatahi does have a record of recent hydrothermal activity.

== Etymology ==
Niuatahi was named by the Tonga Ministry of Lands, Environment, Climate Change and Natural Resources. In the Tongan language, Niuatahi means sea. The name Motutahi means island in the sea in the Tongan language.

== Geography ==
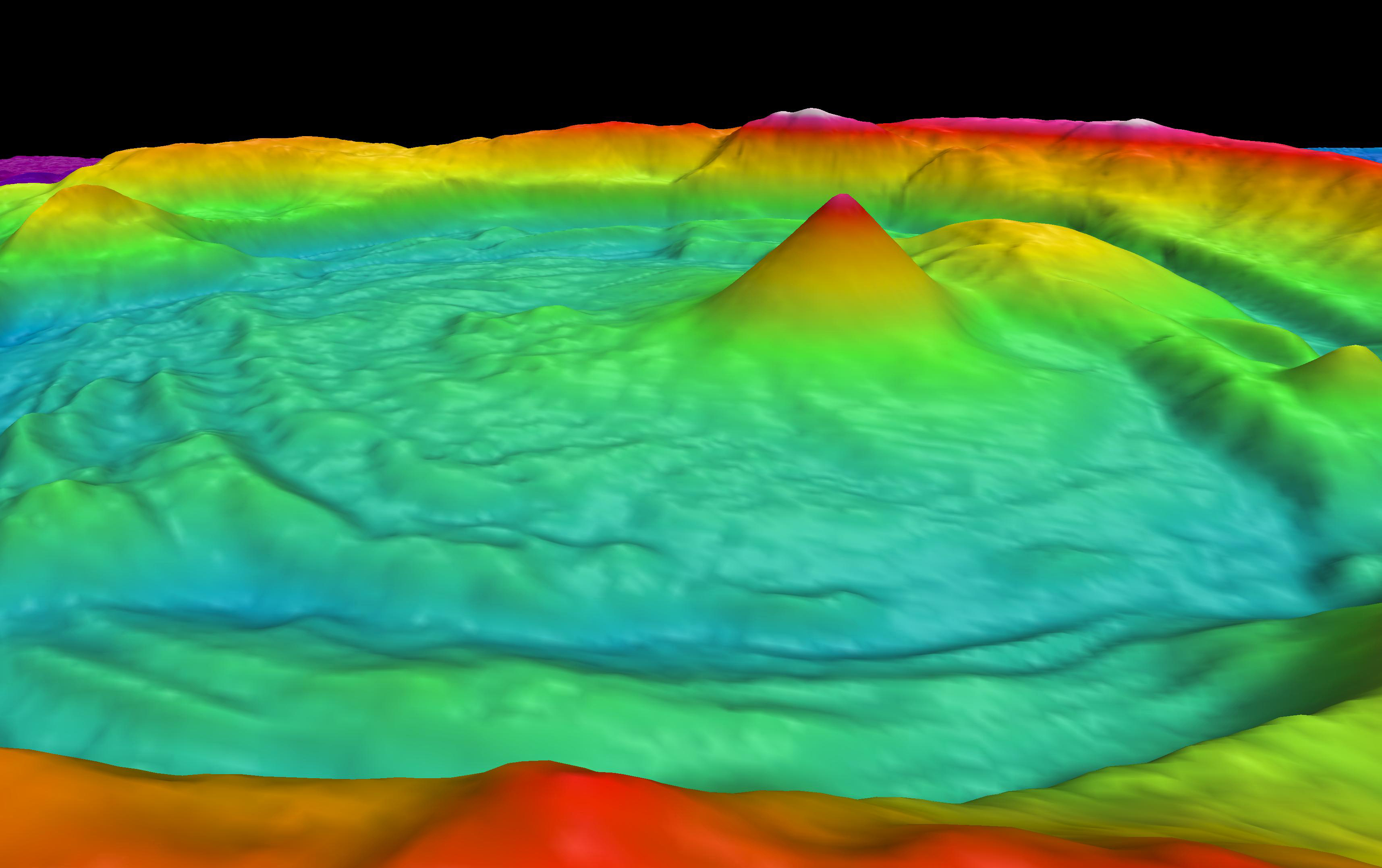
Multibeam bathymetry image of the cone in Niuatahi caldera, viewed from the west looking east.

The volcano can be found approximately 70 km (43 mi) northwest of Niuatoputapu and 240 km (149 mi) southwest of the Samoan Islands. It is also located 40 km (25 mi) southwest of the far more known and more active West Mata submarine volcano, located in the same volcanic group as Niuatahi. An active ridge can also be found just west of the caldera walls.

=== Structure ===
Niuatahi is a submarine volcano mostly known for its circular shape and enormous width. It is 15 km (9 mi) in diameter and with a depth of approximately 700 m (2,297 ft). The Motutahi cone, located in the middle of the caldera, rises 730 m (2,395 ft) above the floor of the caldera. Along the floor of the caldera can also be found active hydrothermal systems. (Note: See the hydrothermal activity section.)

== Geologic setting ==
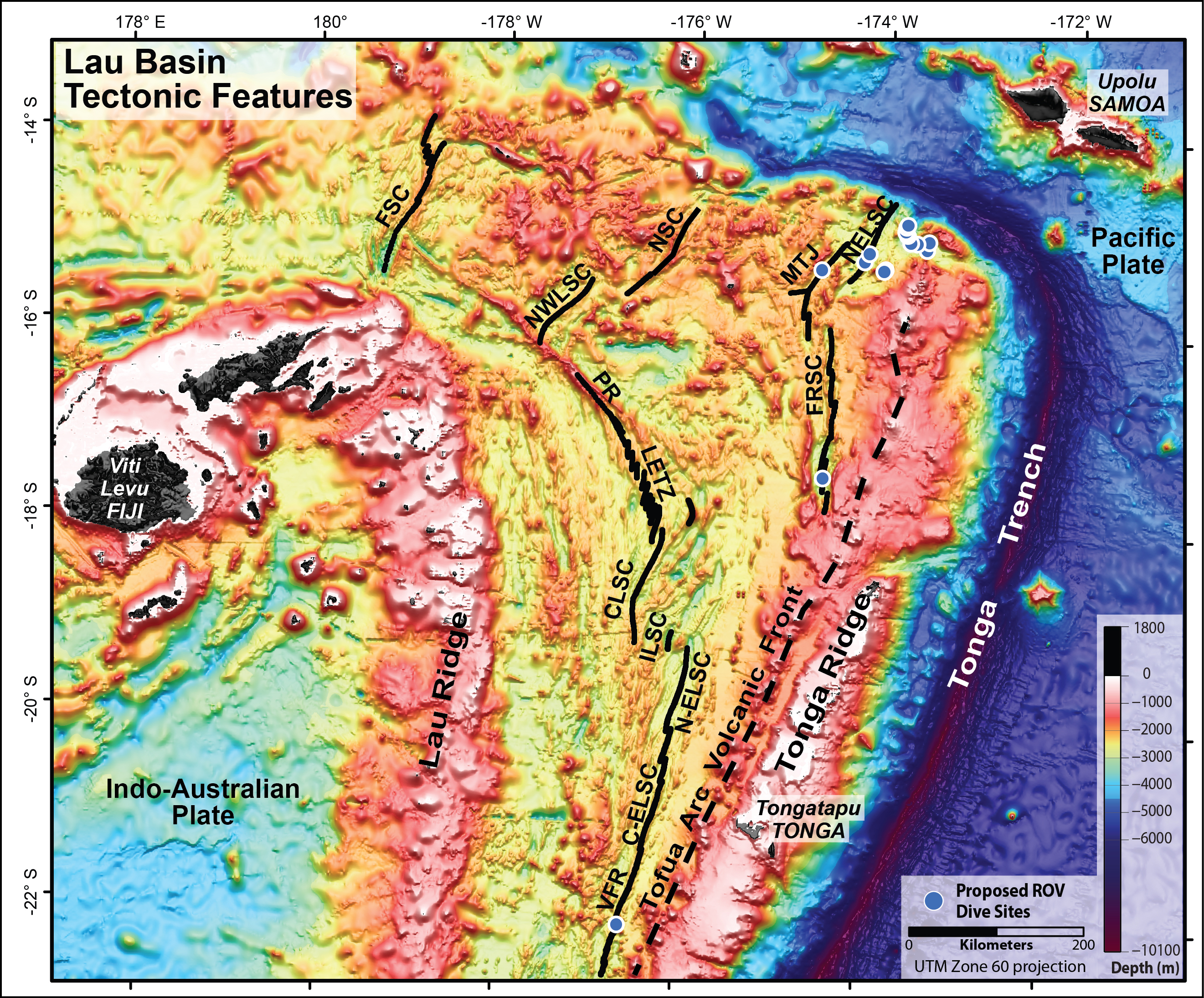
Tectonic features in the Lau Basin

The Niuatahi underwater volcano is located in an area of complex tectonics. It is located in the Lau Back-Arc Basin, which consists of oceanic crust that separates the remnant Lau-Colville Ridge and the active Tofua volcanic arc from each other. The back-arc basin is mainly formed by the rollback (Note: A trench rollback happens when the sinking of the lithosphere causes horizontal stress in the magmatic arc over the lithosphere which later yields and the forearc migrates away with the hinge of subduction.) of the Tonga Trench. The Lau Basin is host to many different geologic structures that are both typical and unique compared to other Pacific back-arc basins. A typical characteristic includes the basin being located above a well-defined Wadati-Benioff zone that points to the location of the subduction of the Cretaceous Pacific Plate lithosphere into the Tonga Trench under the Australian Plate. The Wadati-Benioff zone of the area reaches as deep as 700 km (435 mi) under the North Fiji Basin. The seismic zone lies 140 km (87 mi) below the Tofua arc and 250 km (155 mi) under the Central and Eastern Lau Spreading Centers.

More specifically, Niuatahi can be found in the northeastern part of the Lau Basin. Considering its unique tectonic setting, the NE Lau Basin hosts multiple types of submarine volcanism mostly composed by a subduction-related water-fluxed crust melting and crustal extension. Geochemically, the lavas from the NE Lau Basin vary from mid-ocean ridge basalt-like to arc-like lavas.

== Petrology ==
The analysis of the lava rocks from the center of Niuatahi volcano revealed that the products were composed of aphyric to porphyritic with low-K dacite that consists of mostly glassy material. Meanwhile, in the southeastern part of the caldera, rock samples returned an olivine-bearing basalt composition, pointing to the products being mostly boninite which complies with past research in the area.

== Activity ==
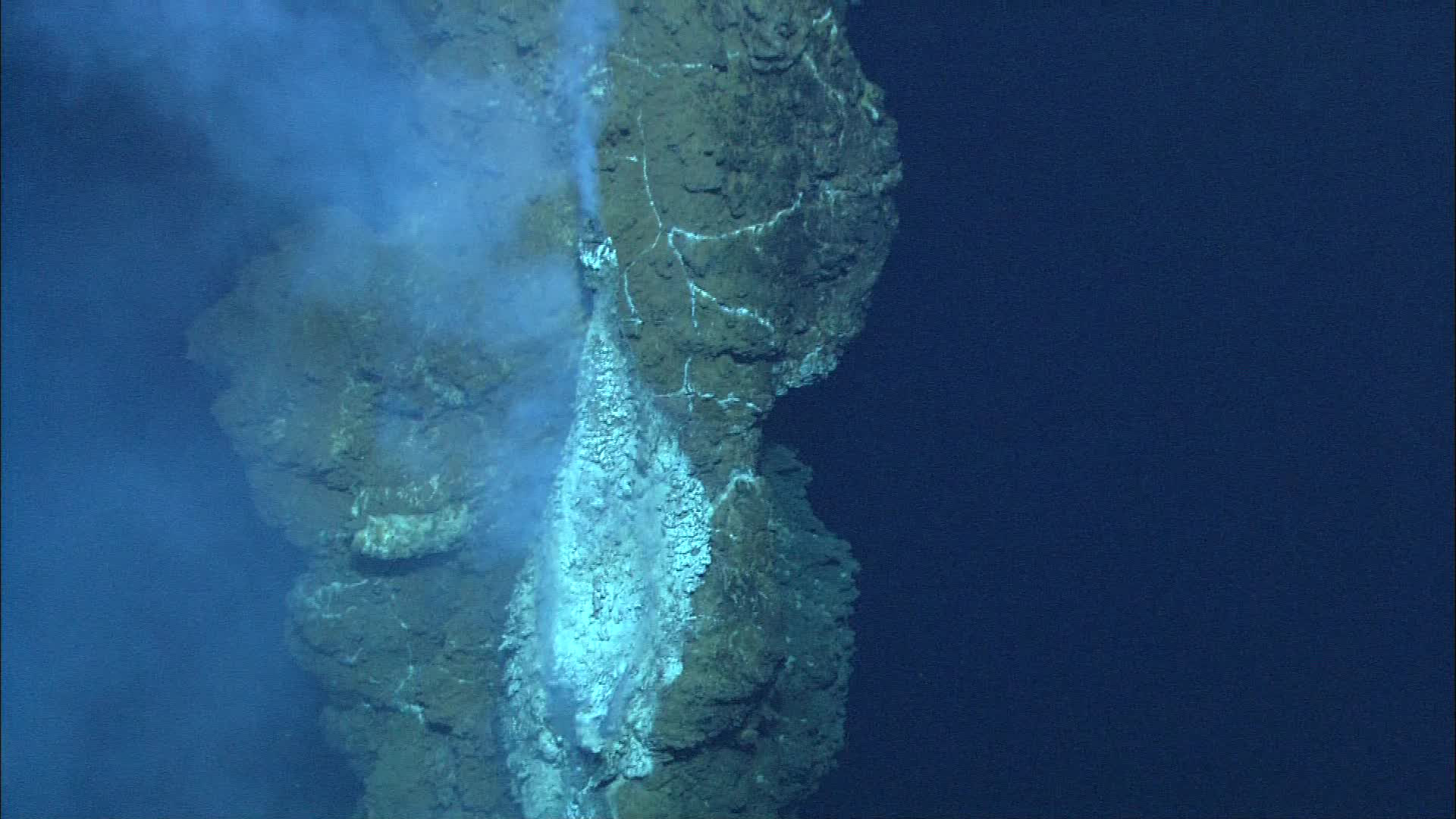
Sulfide chimneys in the Niuatahi caldera

No historical eruptions have been recorded however Niuatahi has been hydrothermally active since its discovery.

=== Hydrothermal activity ===
On the caldera floor and rims of Niuatahi can be found many hydrothermal vents. In 2018, a bathymetric survey expedition was executed and many ROV dives were made in 3 sites around the caldera including the southwest, the south-central and the north of the caldera. In the southwest, venting with 293 °C with clear to gray smoke was observed at 1,680 m (5,512 ft) depth. In the south-central area, clear to black smoke was observed at vents with temperatures of 334 °C at most at a depth similar to the southwest vents. In the north, the vents are located at a shallower depth of 1,550 m (5,085 ft) and they emit clear to black smokes with temperatures of 316 °C at most. All of these vent sites have a sulfide composition, hence the yellowish colors can be seen in some vent smokes.

== See also ==
- West Mata
- List of volcanoes in Tonga

== Sources ==
- Hawkins, J. W. (1995). "The Geology of the Lau Basin". Backarc Basins. pp. 63–138. doi:10.1007/978-1-4615-1843-3_3. ISBN 978-1-4613-5747-6.
- Uyeda, S.; Kanamori, H. (1979). "Back-arc opening and the mode of subduction". J. Geophys. Res. 84 (B3): 1049–1061. doi:10.1029/JB084iB03p01049.
- Falkenberg, J. J.; Keith, M.; Haase, K. M.; Sporer, C.; Bach, W.; Klemd, R.; Strauss, H.; Storch, B.; Peters, C.; Rubin, K. H.; Anderson, M. O. (2022). "Spatial Variations in Magmatic Volatile Influx and Fluid Boiling in the Submarine Hydrothermal Systems of Niuatahi Caldera, Tonga Rear-Arc". Geochemistry, Geophysics, Geosystems. 23 (4): 0–34. doi:10.1029/2021GC010259. S2CID 247756318.
- Park, J-W.; Campbell, I. H.; Kim, J.; Moon, J-W. (2015). "The Role of Late Sulfide Saturation in the Formation of a Cu- and Au-rich Magma: Insights from the Platinum Group Element Geochemistry of Niuatahi–Motutahi Lavas, Tonga Rear Arc". Journal of Petrology. 56 (1): 59–81. doi:10.1093/petrology/egu071.
