= Futuna plate =

Very small tectonic plate near the south Pacific island of Futuna

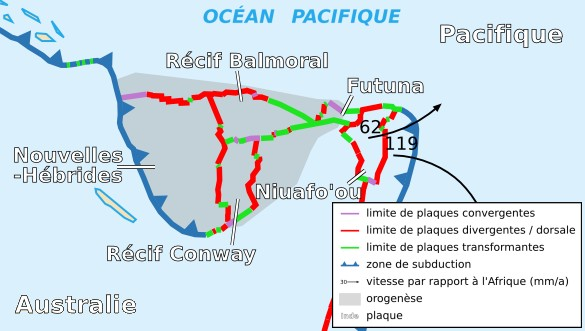
Map of the Futuna plate and its neighbouring plates (in French)

The Futuna plate is a very small tectonic plate located near the south Pacific island of Futuna. It is sandwiched between the Pacific plate to the north and the Australian plate to the south with the Niuafo'ou plate to the east.
