= Boninite =

Ultramafic extrusive rock high in both magnesium and silica

Boninite is an extrusive rock high in both magnesium and silica, thought to be usually formed in fore-arc environments, typically during the early stages of subduction. The rock is named for its occurrence in the Izu-Bonin arc south of Japan. It is characterized by extreme depletion in incompatible trace elements that are not fluid mobile (e.g., the heavy rare-earth elements plus Nb, Ta, Hf) but variable enrichment in the fluid mobile elements (e.g., Rb, Ba, K). They are found almost exclusively in the fore-arc of primitive island arcs (that is, closer to the ocean trench) and in ophiolite complexes thought to represent former fore-arc settings or at least formed above a subduction zone.

Boninite is considered to be a primitive andesite derived from melting of metasomatised mantle. Similar Archean intrusive rocks, called sanukitoids, have been reported in the rocks of several early cratons. Archean boninite lavas are also reported.

== Petrology ==
Boninite typically consists of phenocrysts of pyroxenes and olivine in a crystallite-rich glassy matrix.

== Geochemistry ==
Boninite is defined by

- high magnesium content (MgO = >8%)
- low titanium (TiO_{2} < 0.5%)
- silica content is 52–63%
- high Mg/(Mg + Fe) (0.55–0.83)
- Mantle-normal compatible elements Ni = 70–450 parts per million, Cr = 200–1800 ppm
- Ba, Sr, LREE enrichments compared to tholeiite
- Characteristic Ti/Zr ratios (23–63) and La/Yb ratios (0.6–4.7)

== Genesis ==
Most boninite magma is formed by second stage melting in forearcs via hydration of previously depleted mantle within the mantle wedge above a subducted slab, causing further melting of the already depleted peridotite. A forearc environment is ideal for boninite genesis, but other tectonic environments, such as backarcs, might be able to form boninite. The content of titanium (an incompatible element within melting of peridotite) is extremely low because previous melting events had removed most of the incompatible elements from the residual mantle source. The first stage melting typically forms island arc basalt. The second melting event is partly made possible by hydrous fluids being added to the shallow hot depleted mantle, leading the enrichment in large ion lithophile elements in the boninite.

Boninite attains its high magnesium and very low titanium content via high degrees of partial melting within the convecting mantle wedge. The high degrees of partial melting are caused by the high water content of the mantle. With the addition of slab-derived volatiles, and incompatible elements derived from the release of low-volume partial melts of the subducted slab, the depleted mantle in the mantle wedge undergoes melting.

Evidence for variable enrichment or depletion of incompatible elements suggests that boninites are derived from refractory peridotite which has been metasomatically enriched in LREE, strontium, barium, and alkalis. Enrichment in Ba, Sr and alkalis may result from a component derived from subducted oceanic crust. This is envisaged as contamination from the underlying subducted slab, either as a sedimentary source or as melts derived from the dehydrating slab.

Boninites can be derived from the peridotite residue of earlier arc tholeiite generation which is metasomatically enriched in LREE before boninite volcanism, or arc tholeiites and boninites can be derived from a variably depleted peridotite source which has been variably metasomatised in LREE.

Areas of fertile peridotite would yield tholeiites, and refractory areas would yield boninites.

== Examples ==
Examples of Boninite
Name	Location	Age	Comments
Bonin Islands	Pacific Ocean	Eocene	mostly volcanic breccias and pillow lava flows
Zambales ophiolite	western Luzon	Eocene	upper volcanic unit: high silica boninite, low silica boninite, boninitic basalt. lower volcanic unit: low silica boninite series volcanics
Cape Vogel	Papua New Guinea	Paleocene	
Troodos	Cyprus	Cretaceous	upper pillow lavas of ophiolite complex
Guam	Pacific Ocean	Paleogene	late Eocene to early Oligocene
Setouchi	Japan	Miocene	sanukitoids, 13 million years old
Baja California	Mexico	Miocene	14 to 12 million years old, includes bajaite
New Caledonia	Pacific Ocean	Mesozoic	Permian-Triassic and Cretaceous age
Mariana Trench	Pacific Ocean	Eocene	
North-east Lau Basin	Pacific Ocean	Modern	Eruption of boninite lava was observed in 2009 at West Mata volcano in the Lau Basin by scientists using a remotely-operated submersible. Previously, boninite had been found only near extinct volcanoes more than one million years old.
