= Sanukitoid =

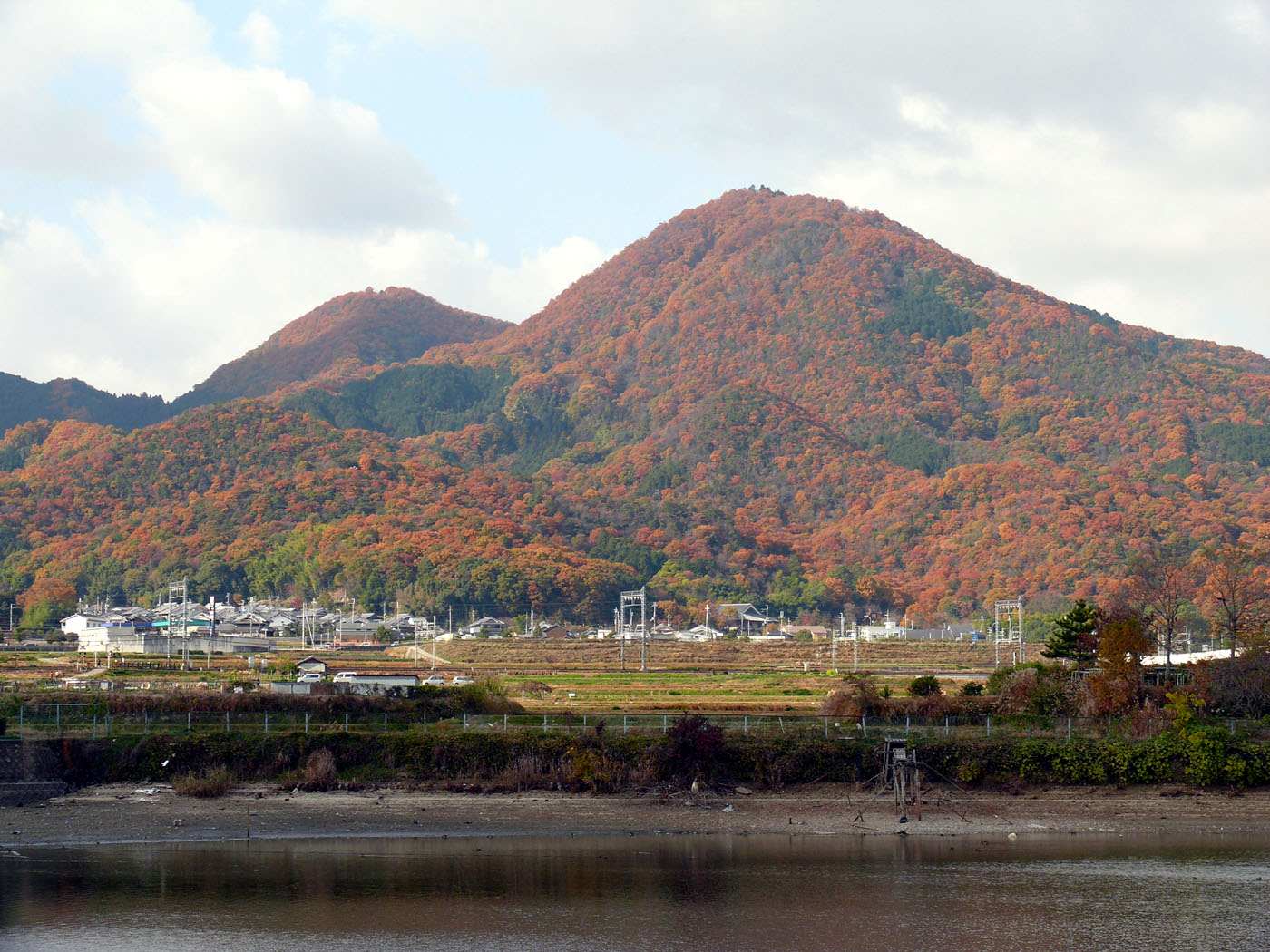
Sanukite is a black hard rock produced in Mt. Nijo on the boundary of Osaka and Nara prefectures

Sanukitoids are a variety of high-Mg granitoid found in convergent margin settings. The term "sanukitoid" was originally used to define a variety of Archean plutonic rock, but now also includes younger rocks with similar geochemical characteristics. They are called "sanukitoid" because of their similarity in bulk chemical composition to high-magnesium andesite from the Setouchi Peninsula of Japan, known as "sanukites" or "setouchites". Sanukite rocks are an andesite characterized by orthopyroxene as the mafic mineral, andesine as the plagioclase, and a glassy groundmass. Rocks formed by processes similar to those of sanukite may have compositions outside the sanukitoid field.

The term was originally defined by Stern et al. (1989) to refer to plutonic rocks containing between 55 and 60 weight percent SiO_{2}, with Mg# >0.6, Ni >100 ppm, Cr >200 ppm, K_{2}O >1 weight percent, Rb/Sr <0.1, Ba >500 ppm, Sr >500 ppm, enrichment in LREEs, and no or minor Eu anomalies. The term "sanukitoid suite" includes more evolved rocks derived from sanukitoid through fractional crystallization. Sanukitoids are similar in trace element compositions to "adakites" but with higher Mg and lower silica. Both suites are thought to form by melting of a mafic igneous rock protolith that has been metamorphosed to garnet-pyroxene (eclogite) or garnet-amphibole assemblages.

The most common source for sanukitoids is probably the mantle, which has been previously metasomatised by silicate melts derived from the melting of a hot, young, subducting slab. When the oceanic crust is subducted and metamorphosed, it is close to its melting point and a slight increase in temperature may cause melting. These melts are initially high in silica at low melt fractions, and decrease in silica as melting proceeds. Melts derived from the eclogite or garnet-amphibole slab are strongly enriched in Sr (no plagioclase in residue) and depleted in HREE and Y (abundant garnet in residue). This melt reacts with the mantle to create the characteristic high Sr, low Y, and high LREE/HREE ratios. Some adakites may form by melting of thick crustal roots of island arcs, but these cannot assimilate mantle wedge components so sanukitoids will not form in this setting.

Sanukitoids and adakites are distinct from another variety of high-Mg andesite called boninite; boninites have major element concentrations similar to sanukitoids, but they are extremely depleted in incompatible trace elements (e.g., LREE) despite their relatively high silica contents. Thus there is no evidence that the mantle wedge that melts to form a sanukitoid has experienced previous extensive melt extraction.

Sanukite has been used as the material for the bars of the hōkyō, a lithophone invented in Japan.

== Additional reading ==
- Barager, W.R.A and T.N. Irvine. (1971) "A Guide to the Chemical classification of the Common Volcanic Rocks." Canadian Journal of Earth Sciences, Vol. 8, pp. 523–548.
