= Lau–Colville Ridge =

Oceanic ridge in the south-west Pacific Ocean between Fiji and New Zealand

- Stratigraphic range: 14–2.6 Ma
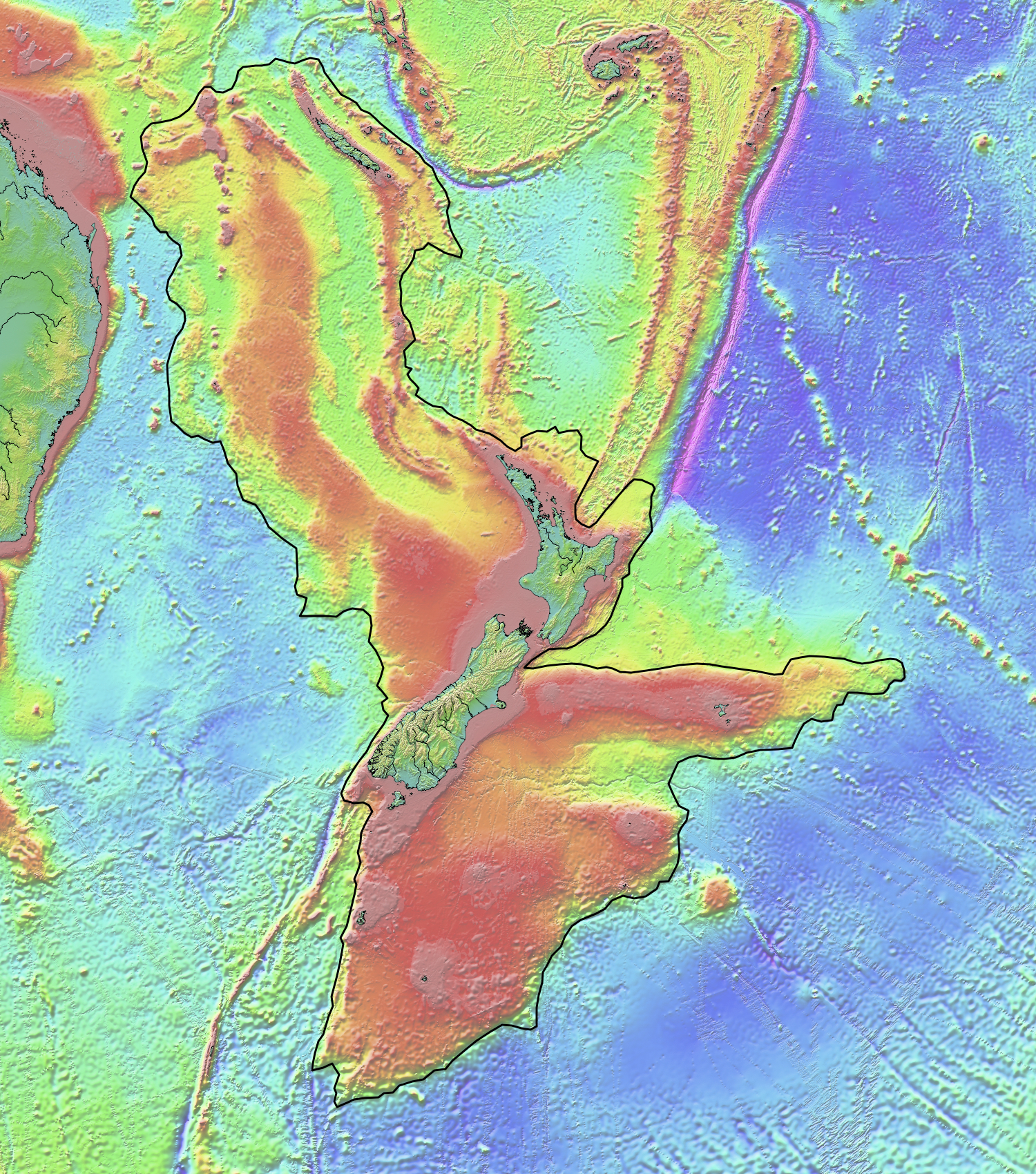
- . The extinct Lau–Colville Ridge is to the west of more geologically active Pacific Ocean seafloor features.
- Type: Igneous

Lithology
- Primary: mafic picro-basalts to dacite
- Other: Underlying diverse subduction and other rocks >100 Ma old

Location
- Coordinates: 27.1°S 179.2°W
- Region: South Pacific
- Country: New Zealand

Type section
- Named for: Lau Islands and Cape Colville
- Approximate surface projection on Pacific Ocean of the Coville Ridge (brown).'"`UNIQ--ref-00000002-QINU`"' Clicking on the map enlargement icon shows also the Lau Ridge (orange) '"`UNIQ--ref-00000003-QINU`"' and the northern portion of the Lau Ridge which as it widens and flattens is shown as a band shaded light orange from south of the Lau Islands that is essentially illustrative.

The Lau–Colville Ridge is an extinct oceanic ridge located on the oceanic Australian Plate in the south-west Pacific Ocean extending about 2,700 km (1,700 mi) from the south east of Fiji to the continental shelf margin of the North Island of New Zealand. It was an historic subduction boundary between the Australian Plate and the Pacific Plate and has important tectonic relationships to its east where very active spreading and subduction processes exist today. It is now the inactive part of an eastward-migrating, 100 million year old Lau-Tonga-Havre-Kermadec arc/back-arc system or complex and is important in understanding submarine arc volcanism because of these relationships. To its west is the South Fiji Basin whose northern bedrock is Oligocene in origin.

== Geography ==
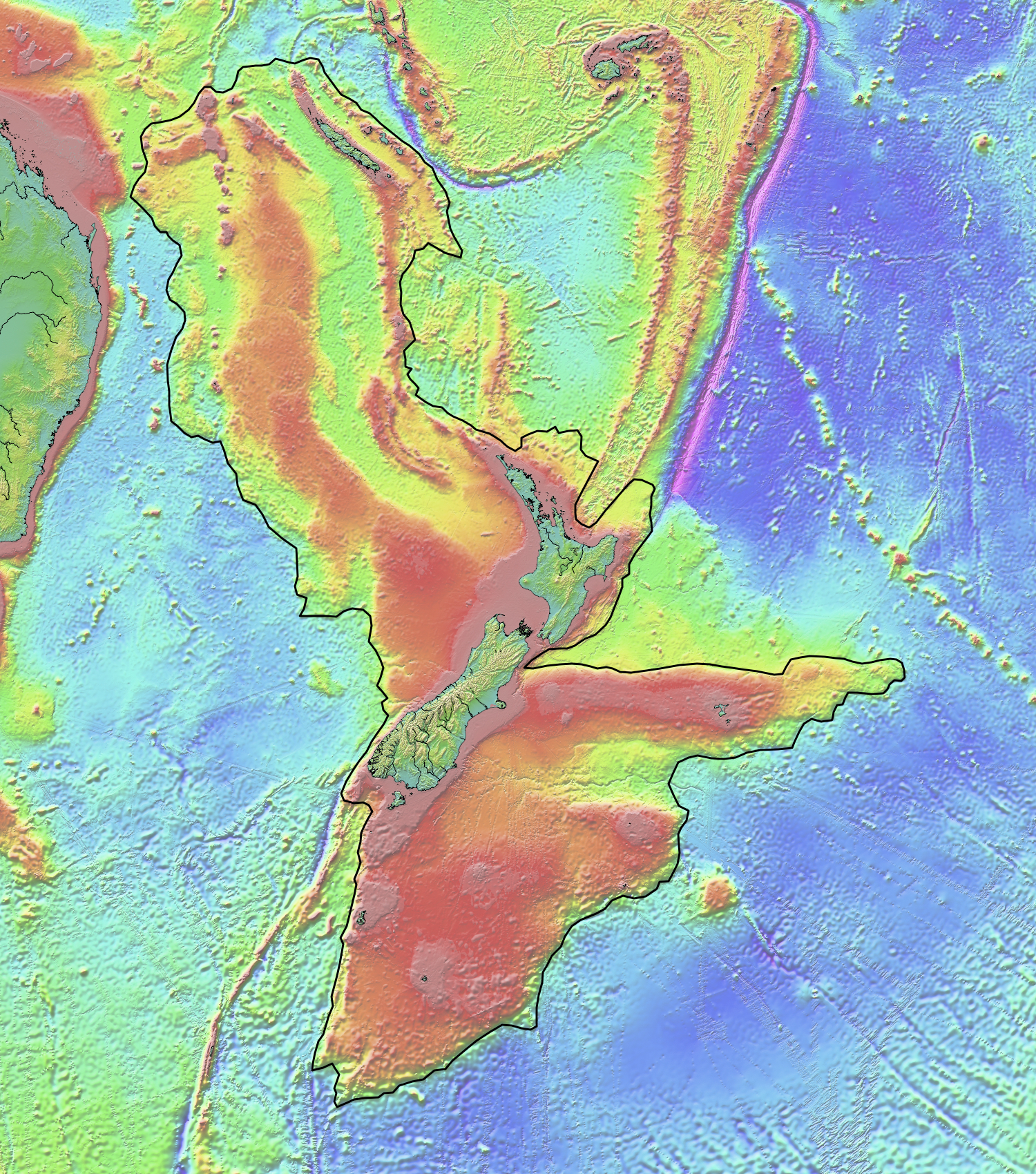
Relationships of the Lau and Coville ridges. The spreading center abbreviations in the Lau basin are Central Lau Spreading Center (CLSC) and Eastern Lau Spreading Center.

It is divided into two segments as the ridge is flanked on its eastern side by two southward propagating back-arc basins, the northern Lau Ridge (called historically the South Fiji Ridge and also known as the Fiji Ridge, Neckes Ridge and Southern Fiji Ridge) that forms the western boundary of the Lau Basin and has contributed to many islands south east of Fiji. The Lau Basin to its east currently contains 6 million year old active spreading centers between the Australian and Niuafo'ou or Tonga microplates. The southern Colville Ridge (also known as Khrebet Kolvil-Lau from Russian Хребет Колвил-Лау)forms the western boundary of the Havre Trough. The Havre Trough has had rift extension for the last 2 million years between the Australian plate and the Kermadec microplate and this extends into Zealandia's continental Taupō Rift and New Zealand's Taupō Volcanic Zone.

=== Geology ===
The remnant andesitic volcanic arc Lau Ridge was mainly active between 14 and 6 million years ago although late volcanism persisted until 2.5 million years ago. The Colville Ridge has been found to have volcanics aged between 7.5 to 2.6 million years ago. The composition range is from mafic picro-basalt to dacite with arc-type element patterns intermediate between Pacific mid ocean ridge basalt and subducted lithosphere. The South Fiji Basin to the west of the Lau–Colville Ridge contains back‐arc basin basalts up to 33 million years old that were erupted during spreading and some ocean island like basalts erupted several million years after spreading ceased in the basin which was before 22 million years ago Directly to the east of the ridge in its central portion the Lau basin contains an area of sediment that has been called the Western Sedimentary Basin. The sediments in the Havre Trough can be up to 1.5 km (0.93 mi) thick.

=== Tectonics ===
The late Miocene rifting of about 6 million years ago initiated in what was an old forearc (called the Vitiaz Arc) and was in Cretaceous-Eocene arc crust that became part of the northern Lau Ridge. Currently back-arc spreading to the east of the Lau Ridge in the adjacent Lau Basin occurs along a number of spreading centers and the Valu Fa Ridge (VFR). As we come south down the Lau Basin spreading rates decrease being for the Central Lau Spreading Centre (CLSC) 120 mm (4.7 in)/year, just above Eastern Lau Spreading Center (ELSC) 102 mm (4.0 in)/year, at the start of the Valu Fa Ridge (VFR) to the south 69 mm (2.7 in)/year, and at its southern end 48 mm (1.9 in)/year, consistent with the southward propagation previously mentioned. These spreading centers have now partially dismembered the Lau Ridge. To the south it is now thought seafloor spreading at the Havre Trough started about 5.5–5.0 million years ago in response to the rollback of the subducting Pacific Plate and terminated abruptly about 3.0–2.5 million years ago, perhaps explaining the long noted lack of a mid oceanic ridge structure but rather rift like subsidance.

== See also ==
- Taupō Volcanic Zone
- Zealandia
