= Lau Basin =

Oceanic basin in the South Pacific Ocean between Fiji and Tonga

Approximate surface projection on Pacific Ocean of Lau Basin. Spreading centers are shown in yellow. Clicking on map allows enlargement and mouse-over of features.

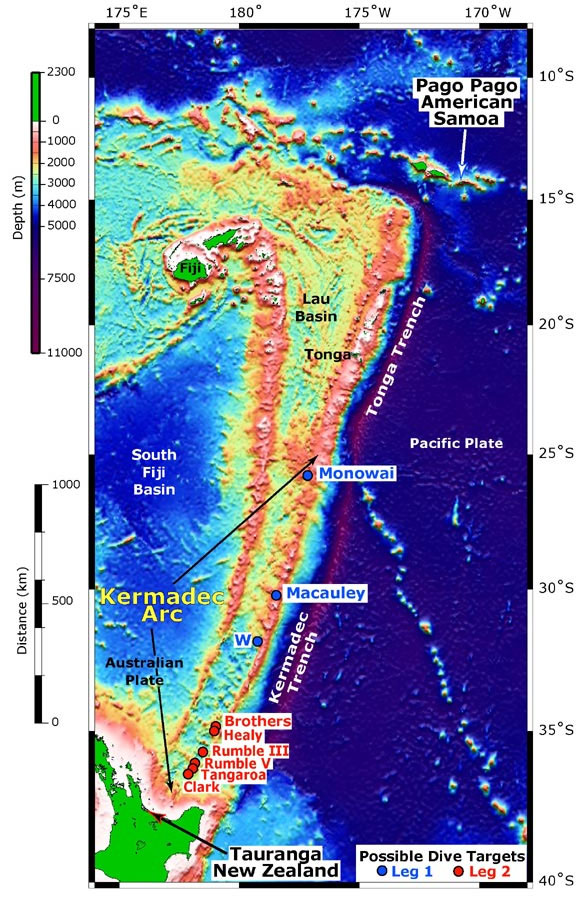
The Lau Basin in the upper part of the arc-backarc complex

The Lau Basin is a back-arc basin (also addressed as "interarc basin") at the Australian-Pacific plate boundary. It is formed by the Pacific plate subducting under the Australian plate. The Tonga-Kermadec Ridge, a frontal arc, and the Lau-Colville Ridge, a remnant arc, sit to the eastern and western sides of the basin, respectively. The basin has a raised transition area to the south where it joins the Havre Trough.

== History ==
Lau Basin is a young basin (much is less than 5 million years old) that separates a previously continuous island arc by extensional rifting and spreading. During the Pliocene, the Pacific plate was subducting beneath the Australian plate. The slab of the Pacific plate melted as it was thrust down, and then rose to form the original Tonga-Kermadec Ridge. Around 25 million years ago, the Pacific plate started to drift away from the Australian plate, thus splitting the volcanic ridge. The rifting was initially caused by extension until 6 million years ago, by which time seafloor spreading started in this region and eventually formed the Lau Basin between the separated ridges. In the north the basin reaches its maximum width of 500 km (310 mi) with a triangular shape to the south understood to be the result of the southward propagation of the main extensional centers and their asymmetric, predominantly westward opening.

== Spreading centers ==
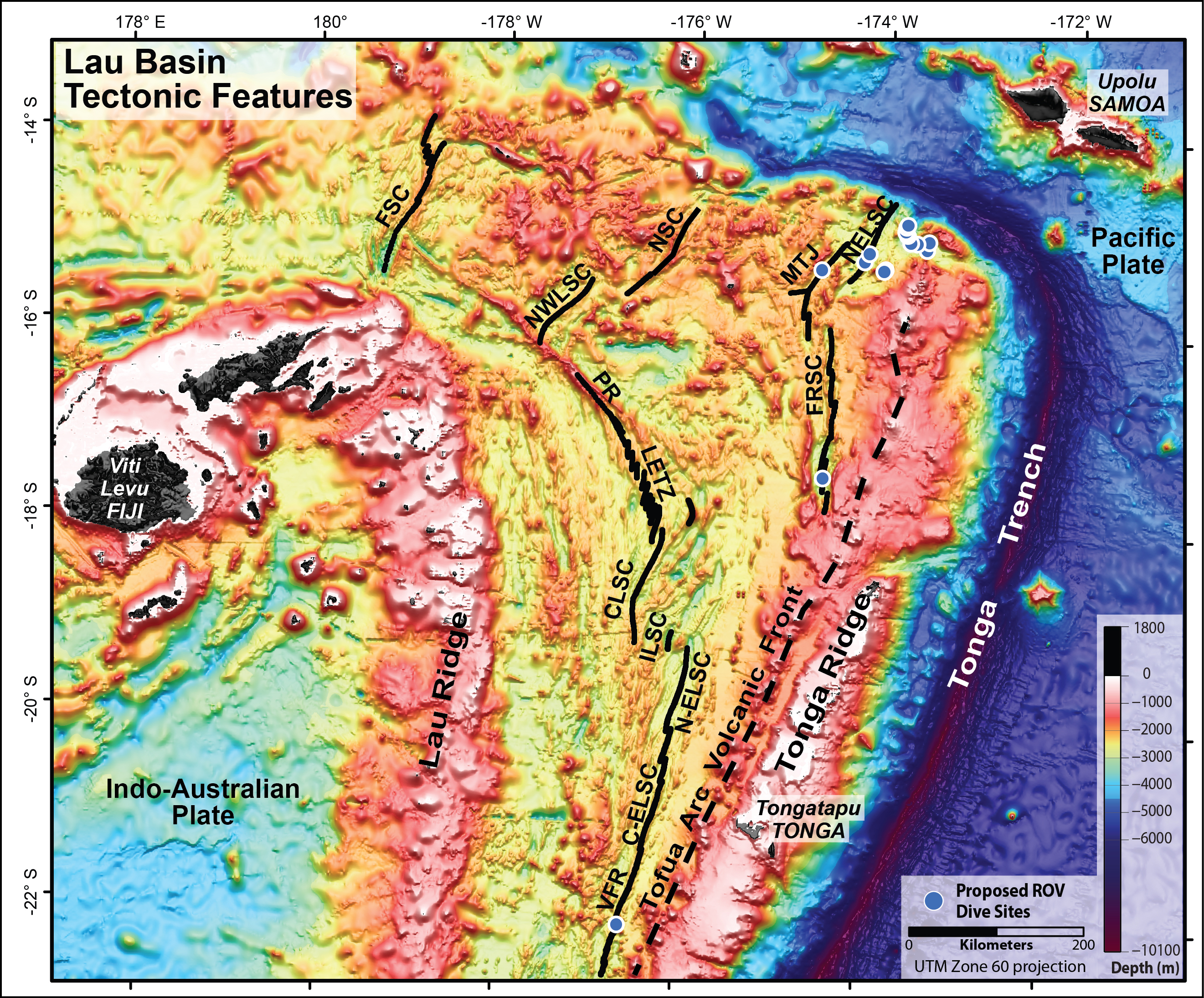
Spreading centers associated with the Lau Basin. KEY: C-ELSC - Central Eastern Lau Spreading Center CLSC - Central Lau Spreading Center FRSC - Fonualei Rift and Spreading Center FSC - Futuna Spreading Center ILSC - Intermediate Lau Spreading Center LETZ - Lau Extensional Transform Zone MTJ - Mangatolu Triple Junction NELSC - North-East Lau Spreading Center NWLSC - North-West Lau Spreading Center VFR-Valu Fa Ridge

=== Southward propagating ===
The V-shaped Lau Basin was opened by two southward propagating spreading centers: the Central Lau Spreading Center (CLSC) and the East Lau Spreading Center (ELSC). The initial ELSC was oriented north–south and has a spreading rate of about 100 mm (3.9 in)/year. It erupts mid-ocean ridge basalt (MORB). The northeastern tip of ELSC propagated southward faster than the other part and produced a pseudofault oriented 170 degree. The ELSC rotated 15–25 degree clockwise and continued to propagate towards the south. Then the CLSC, as well as an extensional transform zone (ETZ) linking the two spreading centers were formed. The CLSC propagated southwards and replaced the northern segment ELSC. The region of overlap of CLSC and ELSC is characterized by strike-slip earthquakes. There is an Intermediate Lau spreading center (ILSC) between the two and to the east of the ELSC which has now four characterised segments. In the 3rd segment of the ELSC there is a transition in ridge morphology, associated with a substantial decrease of basin depth, from 2.7 km (1.7 mi) to 2.1 km (1.3 mi) which has been correlated with the appearance of an axial magma chamber reflector in the southern part of the ELSC. Recent measurements have shown that the opening rates are increasing at ELSC and CLSC. At present, the spreading rate of Lau Basin is about 150 mm (5.9 in)/year and as an example of a fast-spreading back-arc basin much additional study has been undertaken which has identified additional spreading centers. As we come south down the Lau Basin spreading rates decrease being for the CLSC 120 mm (4.7 in)/year, just to the north of the ELSC at the ILSC 102 mm (4.0 in)/year, at the start of the Valu Fa Ridge (VFR) to the south 69 mm (2.7 in)/year, and at its southern end 48 mm (1.9 in)/year. Some authors have combined the VFR as part of the ELSC but the geology is slightly different. The southernmost spreading segment (it has two segments) of the VFR approaches to within 20 km (12 mi) of the arc to its east at about 24°S and is only 1,700 m (5,600 ft) deep. These spreading centers have now partially dismembered the Lau Ridge. South of the VFR, the back-arc region is mainly an area of stretched arc crust with abundant normal faulting but no obvious spreading and is called the Southern Lau Rift (SLR), an area of current active shallow earthquakes. Similarly to the south the Havre Trough has currently only rifting. To the north east is the southern section of the Fonualei Rift and Spreading Center (FRSC) which is southward propagating but to the north the interactions of the FRSC appear more complex and are mentioned below.

=== Otherwise propagating ===
From the north of the CLSC we have a northeast orientated Lau Extensional Transform Zone (LETZ) which joins up to the Peggy Ridge which is a fairly linear SW to NE orientated ridge greater than 200 km (120 mi) in the central Lau Basin (Labelled PR in diagram of basin on this page). The LETZ accommodates east to west extension but so does the FRSC to its east and such a double parallel arrangement has not been identified in any other back-arc basin. There is considerable complexity at the northern part of the Lau Basin where presently five independent oceanic tetectonic plates are interacting. The northwest aspect of the Lau basin has the Northwest Lau Spreading Center (NWLSC). This is spreading at 75 mm (3.0 in)/year. The Rochambeau Rifts to the NWLSC's northeast are moving apart at 110 mm (4.3 in)/year. To the east of the Rochambeau Rifts is an area of sea floor spreading between the Niuafo'ou plate and northern Tonga plate. From the north south we have the Northeast Lau Spreading Center (NELSC) separating at 42 mm (1.7 in)/year, the area south of the Mangatolu Triple Junction (MTJ, also known as the Kings Triple Junction) which is separating at 30 mm (1.2 in)/year and the FRSC whose first northern segment is propagating northwards with a spreading rate of 28 mm (1.1 in)/year in the north east Lau Basin but down to 9 mm (0.35 in)/year where the last segment of the FRCS intercepts the Tofua volcanic arc to the west of the Tonga Ridge. A prominent NW-trending formation of young volcanic structures that includes the Niuafo'ou shield volcano crosses the northern Lau Basin approximately 75 km (47 mi) west of the MTJ and is called the Western Rift Margin (WRM). To the east of the WRM the seafloor has multiple NNW trending elongated ridges of roughly the same orientation as the WRM, while to its west the seafloor is more chaotic with much volcanism.

== Petrology ==
Lau Basin volcanics are mainly andesites and dacites that were erupted 6.4 to 9.0 Ma. Most mafic rocks found are 55% SiO2 basaltic andesites. The whole basin floor is mostly composed of MORB-like rocks, but the westmost 80~120 km of the basin floor contains a mixture of MORB, transitional and arc-like basalts. This western region has a different composition because it was formed by extension and rifting between the Lau and Tonga ridges before seafloor spreading started. The grabens in this region was then filled by fresh magma from a mantle source that is different from the mantle source for CLSC/ELSC. In the north eastern portion of the basin there is over 402 km^{2} (155 sq mi) of dacite lava north of the Niuatahi seafloor caldera which appears to have come from seafloor activity not associated with the caldera which on its flanks also has some dacite eruptives. The southern basin volcanics and that of the ʻAta volcano can be associated with recycling from the subducted portions of the Louisville Seamount Chain. Dredged lavas from the FRSC are almost identical to lavas from the nearby arc volcanoes. To the south the lavas in this part of the Lau Basin are more arc-like than the MORB at the ELSC, with basalt and andesite present. Further south the eruptives of the rift valley east of the SLR are mainly andesitic and/or dacitic while the western margin of the SLR has andesites and basalts.

== Mantle source ==
The source of mantle melt to the Lau Basin is centered west of the spreading centers at shallow depth. This source may have directly supplied the western part of Lau Basin. The MORB-type basalt filled the grabens that were originally formed by extension in western Lau Basin. Asymmetric melt supply gave rise to the asymmetric thickness of crust at different sections of the basin. This melt supply may still be continuing today as indicated by a low-velocity anomaly in the upper mantle beneath the western Lau Basin.

== Mantle convection ==
At the subduction boundary between Pacific plate and the Tonga and Kermadec plates, the roll-back of the Tonga Trench and Pacific slab caused compensating flow of the mantle beneath the Lau Basin. This fertile mantle then encounters the water released from the dehydrated subducting Pacific slab and undergoes partial melting. This results in the creation of a batch of depleted mantle between the fertile mantle and subducting slab. An upward flow of the depleted layer is then induced by back-arc spreading and slab subduction towards corner region where the mantle is hydrated. The enhanced melting in this region prevents the depleted mantle from getting re-enriched and thus allows it to flow until it overturns. It is then carried back down beneath the back-arc as subduction continues. The ELSC located right on top of the highly depleted mantle thus experiences a diminished magma supply which results in a thinner layer of crust and a faster spreading rate. The CLSC, on the other hand, has thicker crust because it overlies the fertile mantle that is largely removed from effect of the volcanic front. Unlike ELSC, CLSC has characteristics that are much more similar to a mid-ocean ridge.

== Crustal structure ==
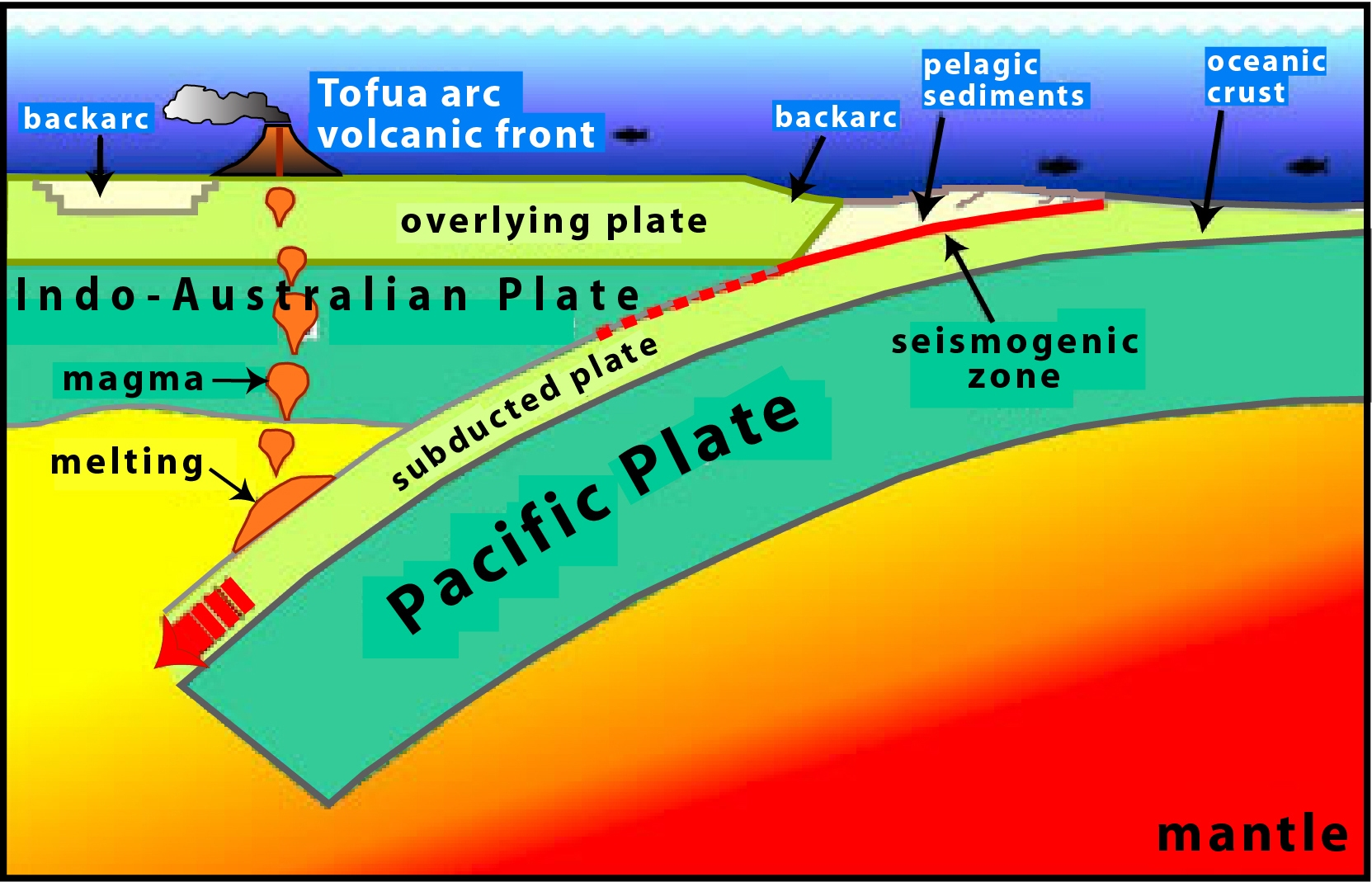
Crustal structure in the region. The back-arc marked on the far left is the Lau Basin.

Crustal thickness increases from 6 km (3.7 mi) in the east to 9 km (5.6 mi) in the west. All of the Lau basin crust has a thicker midcrustal section than is seen in the Pacific plate. The Lau Basin crust can be divided into eastern, central and western sections according to their thickness (5.5–6.5, 7.5–8.5 and 9 km, respectively). crust in the eastern section is similar to the one in the Pacific plate with a thicker midcrustal layer and a thinner lower crustal layer. This suggests that it is composed of oceanic crust that was created more than 1.5 million years ago at the ELSC. The boundary between the eastern and central sections coincides with the boundary between the ELSC crust and CLSC crust, implying the internal structures in these two spreading ridges are, or were different. The central section has relatively thicker crust that formed within the past 1.5 million years at the CLSC. The boundary between the central and western crustal sections lies in the middle of ELSC crust, suggesting that the western section contains crust created both by oceanic spreading at ELSC and by island arc extension from the original Lau Basin. In the ELSC further studies have shown that the back-arc crust created at less than 50 km (31 mi) from the volcanic arc front is unusually thick at 8 to 9 km) and has a thick upper crustal layer and a lower crustal layer ("Domain II crust", "hydrous" crust) due to slab-derived water input into the subaxial melting regime of the back-arc spreading center. Seismic studies show that back-arc crust created at distances greater than 70 km (43 mi) from the volcanic arc front is thinner and more similar to typical oceanic crust ("Domain III crust"). The crust in the southern FRSC was created by extension of arc crust with variable input of magmatism and magmatic underplating is found in some parts of the southern Niuafo'ou microplate.

== Tectonics ==
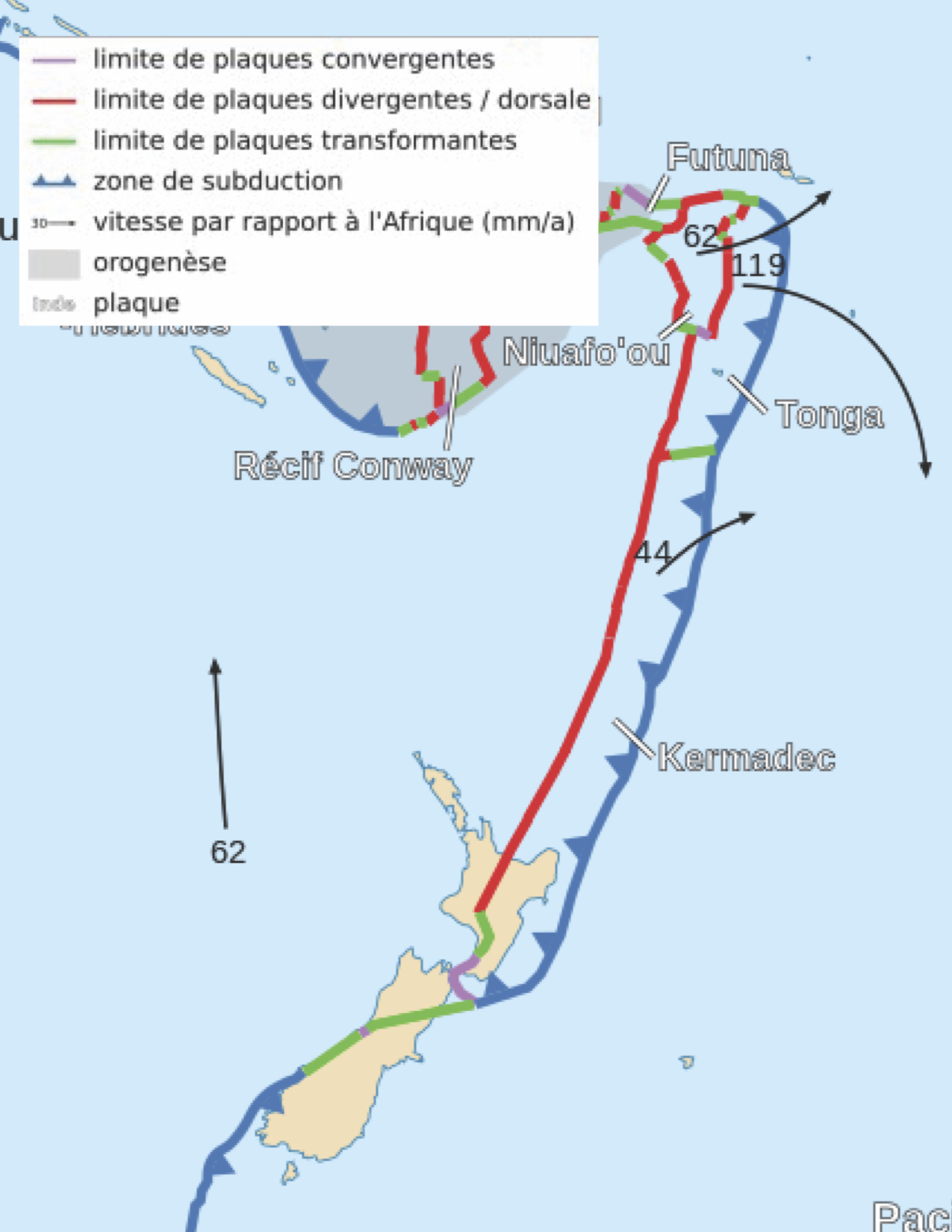
The northern red lines of spreading centers in this diagram of the Kermadec and Tonga plates are those in the Lau Basin

The processes of back-arc basin formation were first proposed by Daniel (Dan) Karig in 1970 from studies of the Lau Basin. The possibility of there being in this region several tectonic plates and triple junctions was suggested by Clement Chase the next year. The Lau Basin presently has oceanic crust from the Australian plate to its east, the Niuafo'ou plate to its north east and the clockwise rotating Tonga plate to its west. The Futuna microplate is in close relationship to the north in this most active tectonic area. In the northern Lau Basin, the extensional motion between the reference points of Australia and Tonga is accommodated by multiple zones of active rifting and spreading that are located along the boundaries of the Niuafo'ou microplate. These are so complex, especially towards the north that other smaller microplates may currently exist and certainly some of the plate boundaries are zones of deformation or for other reasons are ill defined. There is a overlapping spreading center from the northernmost segment of the FRSC in the east to the southernmost segment of the Mangatolu Triple Junction in the west. The relationships between seafloor and crustal properties, that were established based on observations made at mid-ocean ridges such as distance to spreading center, water depth and crustal age may not be strictly applicable in the back-arc basin setting. In particular the complexity of the northern section is best explained if the spreading in back-arc basins is not as linear a process as it is along mid-ocean ridges and rather back arc spreading has the potential for newly emerging or jumping spreading centers.

The west dipping Pacific slab whose bed rock is about 110 millions years old is presently being subducted under the independent Tonga microplate whose spreading center from the Australian Plate are those of the southern Lau Basin. The seismogenic zone below the Lau Basin is very displaced from the Tonga Trench, so that the slab is at about 250 km (160 mi) depth under the Lau Basin spreading axis. The southern limit of the basin is related to the subduction of the Louisville Ridge below the Kermadec-Tonga subduction zone.

== Volcanoes ==
Map of current volcanic activity near the Lau Basin. The spreading centers are shown as red lines.

At present, the Lau Basin is still an active back-arc that is rapidly evolving in time. Six of the seven volcanoes in the Lau Basin are still active. The island volcano of Niuafoʻou has erupted multiple times since historic records began. To the east some islands of Tonga are located in the latitudinal range of the ELSC, notably in view of its recent eruptive history Hunga Tonga–Hunga Haʻapai, 80 km (50 mi) away. It has been suggested that carbonate sediments deposited on a previously subducted Louisville Seamount Chain volcano may have been a factor in the explosive nature of the 2022 eruption. ʻAta is about 50 km (31 mi) east of the Valu Fa Ridge and compositional analysis of its volcanics have identified that these are associated with the subducted portions of the Louisville seamounts. Kao which has the highest point of Tonga and Tofua are about 95 km (59 mi) to the east of the most northern segment of the ELSC. The large Niuatahi caldera is in the northeast of the basin. The eastern side of the basin has the Tofua volcanic arc along the western side of the Tonga Ridge.

== Earthquakes ==
Earthquakes in this region are mostly crustal earthquakes. Small earthquakes from the basin are barely recorded on land because of high mantle attenuation. However low‐magnitude seismicity (i.e. mainly M_{w} less than 5) has been recorded along the active spreading centers in the Lau Basin by ocean bottom seismometers. Most of the earthquakes, as well as volcanic activities locate at the east boundary of Lau Basin, along the Tonga Ridge which is very volcanically active. In the Southern Lau Rift shallow earthquake swarms have occurred. In terms of shallow and thus crustal earthquakes greater than M_{w} 5 it has been possible to group the earthquakes into stress domains:

- Northern Lau Basin region (dominated by right‐lateral strike‐slip faulting in diffuse deformation zones and left‐lateral strike‐slip faulting along prominent crustal‐scale plate boundary faults)
  - North east Fiji stress domain (southern end FSC and Fiji Transform Zone)
  - Central Futuna stress domain (Futuna Central Zone)
  - Northern Lau stress domain (centered on the Rochambeau Rifts)
  - North east Lau and Tonga forearc stress domain (contains the MTJ and NELSC)
- Eastern Lau Basin region
  - Northern FRSC stress domain (dominated by strike‐slip faulting)
  - Southern FRSC stress domain (dominated by extension at the propagating tip)
- Central Lau Basin
  - Peggy Ridge stress domain (to its west where plate boundary as east is inactive now, with the most western portion having transform to extension stresses)
  - Central Lau stress domain (with the plate boundary of the LETZ having transform to extension stresses and the more southern CLSC to ELSC regions having extension to transform stresses)
- Southern Lau Basin region
  - Tofua stress domain (with zone of compression to the west of Tongatapu Island, the main island of Tonga, and transtension to the southeast, adjacent to the active Tofua arc)
  - Valu Fa stress domain (extension at the Valu Fa propagating tip)
