= Jackie Caplan-Auerbach =

Geology professor and seismologist

Jacqueline Caplan-Auerbach is an American seismologist and professor of geology at Western Washington University (Western). She is best known for identifying the "Swift Quake", a seismological phenomenon during Taylor Swift's Eras Tour. Her research usually focuses on the sounds and seismic motions from volcanoes. She currently serves as the associate dean of Western's College of Science and Engineering.

== Personal life and education ==
According to her profile on Classmates.com, Caplan-Auerbach graduated from Redwood High School in Larkspur, California with the class of 1985, and them from the Peninsula School in Menlo Park, California with the class of 1981.

She later received a dual-B.A. in physics and English from Yale University, and later a Ph.D. from University of Hawaiʻi at Mānoa in 2001. Although her educational background is in physics, she found an advisor at the University of Hawaiʻi who was planning to put seismometers on an underwater volcano, and Caplan-Auerbach's interest was piqued, so she joined the team.

Caplan-Auerbach is married to Pete Stelling, also a volcanologist, and retired faculty at Western.
