= Niuafo'ou plate =

Small tectonic plate west of Tonga

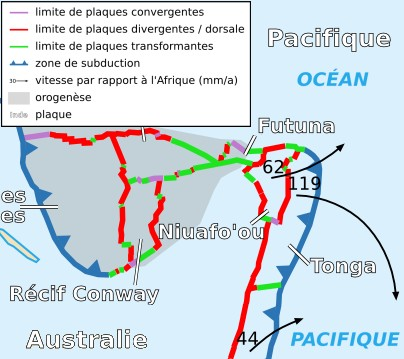
Map of the Niuafoʻou plate and its neighbouring plates (in French)

The Niuafoʻou plate is a small tectonic plate located west of the islands of Tonga in the region of the Lau Basin. This plate is sandwiched between the Pacific plate to the north, the very unstable Tonga plate to the east and the Australian plate to the west. It is primarily surrounded by divergent boundaries. This plate is riddled with active faults thus making the area extremely earthquake prone.

== See also ==
- Tonga-Kermadec Ridge – Ridge in the Pacific Ocean
