= Tonga plate =

Small tectonic plate in the southwest Pacific Ocean

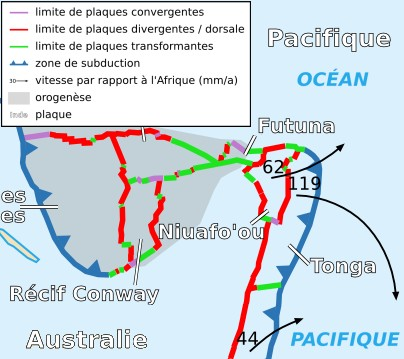
Map of the Tonga plate and its neighbouring plates (in French)

The Tonga plate is a small southwest Pacific tectonic plate or microplate. It is centered at approximately 19° S. latitude and 173° E. longitude. The plate is an elongated plate oriented NNE–SSW and is a northward continuation of the Kermadec linear zone north of New Zealand. The plate is bounded on the east and north by the Pacific plate, on the northwest by the Niuafo’ou microplate, on the west and south by the Indo-Australian plate. The Tonga plate is subducting the Pacific plate along the Tonga Trench. This subduction turns into a transform fault boundary north of Tonga. An active rift or spreading center separates the Tonga plate from the Australian plate and the Niuafo’ou microplate to the west. The Tonga plate is seismically very active and is rotating clockwise.

These were the plates that moved when the 2009 tsunami hit Samoa.

== See also ==
- Tonga–Kermadec Ridge – Oceanic ridge in the south-west Pacific Ocean underlying the Tonga–Kermadec island arc
